= Roehampton Trophy =

The Roehampton trophy is the oldest polo trophy in the United Kingdom. The trophy was first played for at the Roehampton Club in 1902 and was won by Buccaneers. Today it is played for at the Ham Polo Club, the tournament is played for at an 6-goal level and the finals are held in August.

== History ==
The Roehampton Cup is the oldest cup still played for in the United Kingdom, the earliest date on its plinth is the season of 1902 and it was the premier trophy at the Roehampton Polo Club until its demise in 1955. The Trophy itself was donated by Mrs Alison Cunninghame of Craigends upon the opening of the Roehampton Club in 1902.

Roehampton, before the great war, was one of eight metropolitan clubs and the third largest, with over 300 playing members and 550 non-playing members. Those were the days in which an estimated 10,000 polo ponies were stabled in and around London during the season and Roehampton, with Hurlingham and Ranelagh, was the base for one of the three Open Championships of the time.

The Roehampton Cup has seen some notable holders. In 1911, for example, the trophy was won by Comte Johnnie de Madre's Tigers Team, who wore pure silk shirts, hand embroidered with gold thread. Lord Rocksavage and Captain J. F. Harrison (after whom the Harrison Cup at Cowdray was later named) were among the old Etonian winners in 1914, while in 1925 a high powered Argentine team, La Pampa, led by Jack Nelson was victorious.

Eric Horace Tyrrell-Martin, who was to play in the International Polo Cup final 1939, was in the winning team in 1934 and 1935; whilst J. F. Harrison, by then a Major, won the Cup for a second time for 'The Pandas' in the last pre war tournament at the club.

Suitably, as it was to turn out, Ham Polo Club newly revived by Billy Walsh, won the cup in the first post-war tournament of 1947. Later names engraved on the trophy include some of the leading players of their day; among them Peter W. Dollar, Alec Harper, Haunut Sing, Heskie Baig, Charles Smith-Ryland, John Lankin and Humphrey Patrick Guinness.

Following the closure of the Roehampton Polo Club, Edward Tauchert, then player at Ham Polo Club arranged for the Roehampton Golf Club to kindly donate the trophy to Ham Polo Club where it has remained ever since. It became a popular trophy at Ham and in the 1990s through the efforts of John O'Driscoll the Roehampton was reintroduced as a Tournament.

== The Tournament Today ==
From 2008 until 2015 the League stages of the tournament were being played at Ali Albwardy's private polo grounds in Windsor, the base of Dubai Polo Team. The finals though were still held at Ham Polo Club on the Number One ground. From 2016 onwards the early games have been held at the Black Bears grounds in Henley-upon-Thames with the finals day still taking place at Ham Polo Club

In 2012, the 110th year of the competition, a sponsorship deal was signed with Bang and Olufsen of Kingston with the tournament becoming known as the 'Roehampton Trophy brought to you by Bang and Olufsen of Kingston'. In 2015, 2016 and 2017 sponsorship was taken on by London Square, the developers behind the restoration of the Royal Star and Garter Home, Richmond. In 2020 the title sponsorship was taken by Fabergé.

From 2016 to present the Best Playing Pony and MVP awards have been sponsored by Hugs & Co.

The Roehampton takes place in late August to avoid overlapping with HPA Victor Ludorum tournaments played at the same handicap.

== Sponsors ==
- 2012 - Bang and Olufsen / Aston Martin
- 2013 - Bang and Olufsen / Aston Martin
- 2014 - Bang and Olufsen / Aston Martin
- 2015 - London Square
- 2016 - London Square
- 2017 - London Square
- 2018 -
- 2019 -
- 2020 -Fabergé
- 2021 -Fabergé
- 2022 -Fabergé

== Winners ==
Not counting the years of the two world wars when polo ceased in England, there are 35 years missing from the commemorative plinth. The recorded winners are as follows.

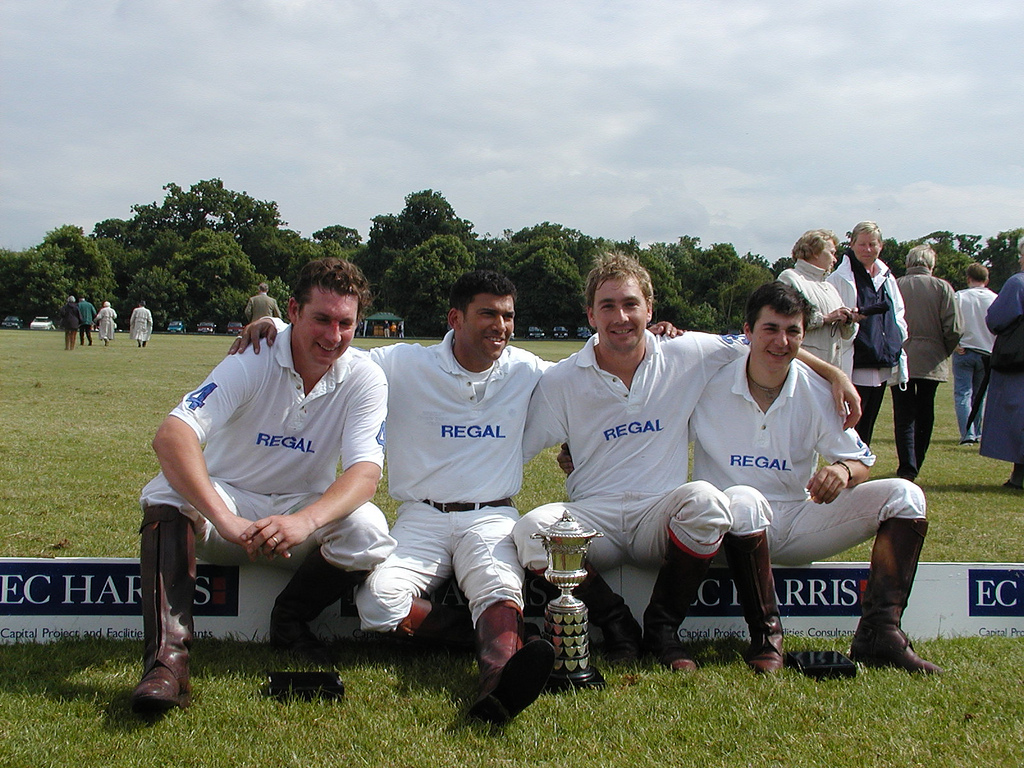
2001 Roehampton Trophy winners Regal: Martin Stegman, Raphael Sing, Tarquin Southwell and S. Baselli.

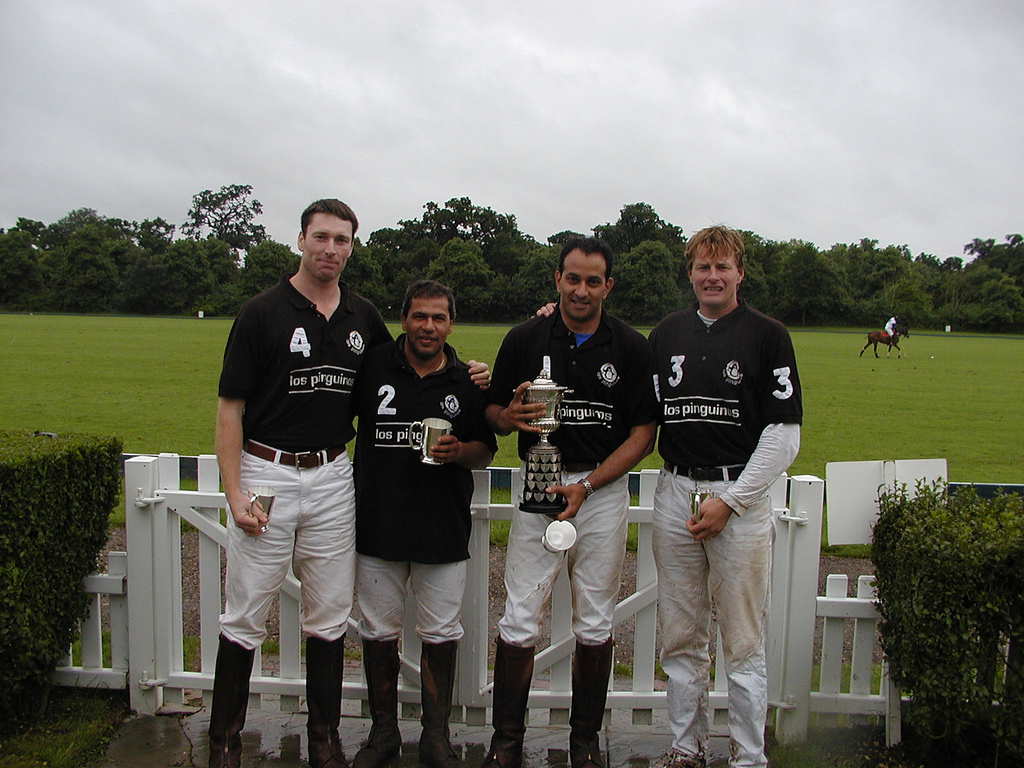
2002 Roehampton Trophy winners Los Penguinos: Sam Gardiner, Alan Ruzzaman, Mark Pasaud and Martin ffrench-Blake.

2005 Roehampton Trophy winners Clarita: Clare Mathias, Corin Gibbs, Sam Gardner and Chris Mathias. Runners up Beetles.

2006 Roehampton Trophy winners Montana: Ariel Tapia, Tony Gerrard, Adam Leech and Martin Roman. Runners up AFB.

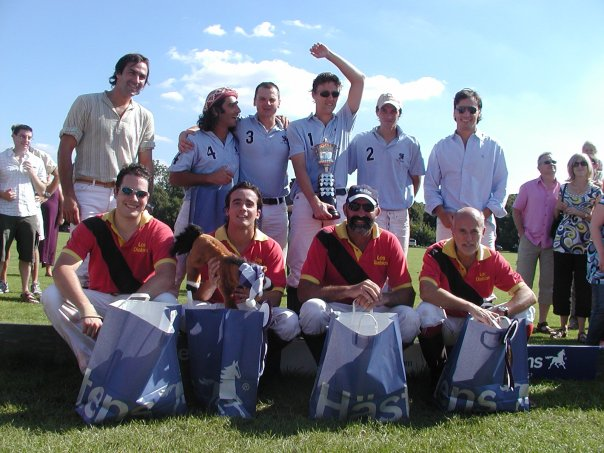
2007 Roehampton Trophy winners Los Dientes: Oscar Mancini, Sebastian Dawnay, Mathew Tooth and Lucas Fernandez. Runners up Los Diablos.

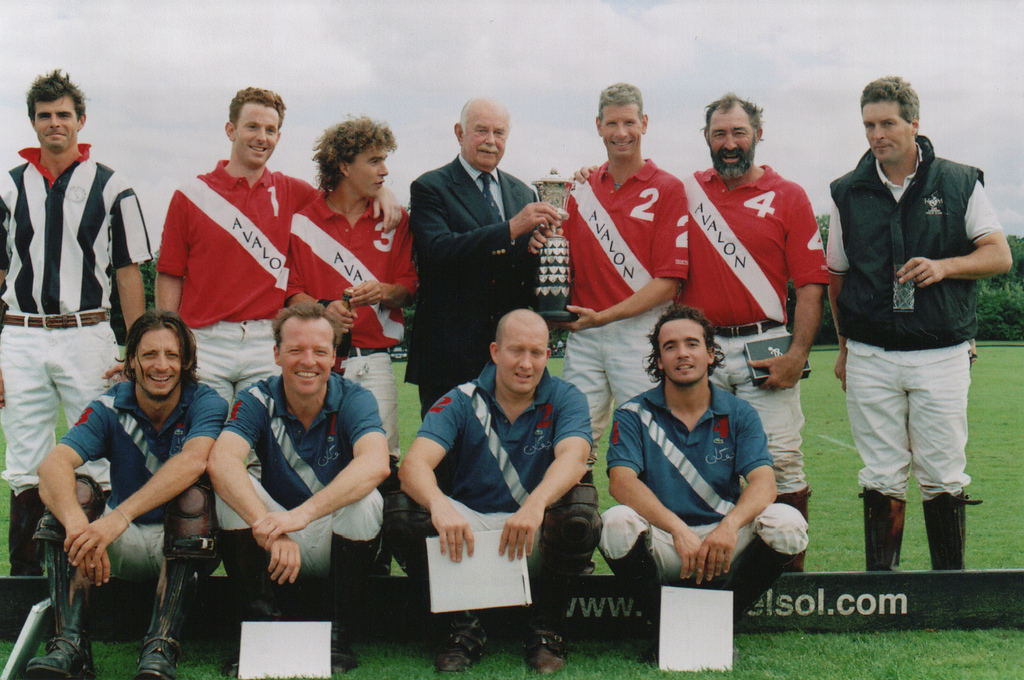
2008 Roehampton Trophy winners Avalon: Christopher Caesar, Nico Talamoni, Jeffrey Schlesinger and Greg Keyte. Runners up Tchogan.

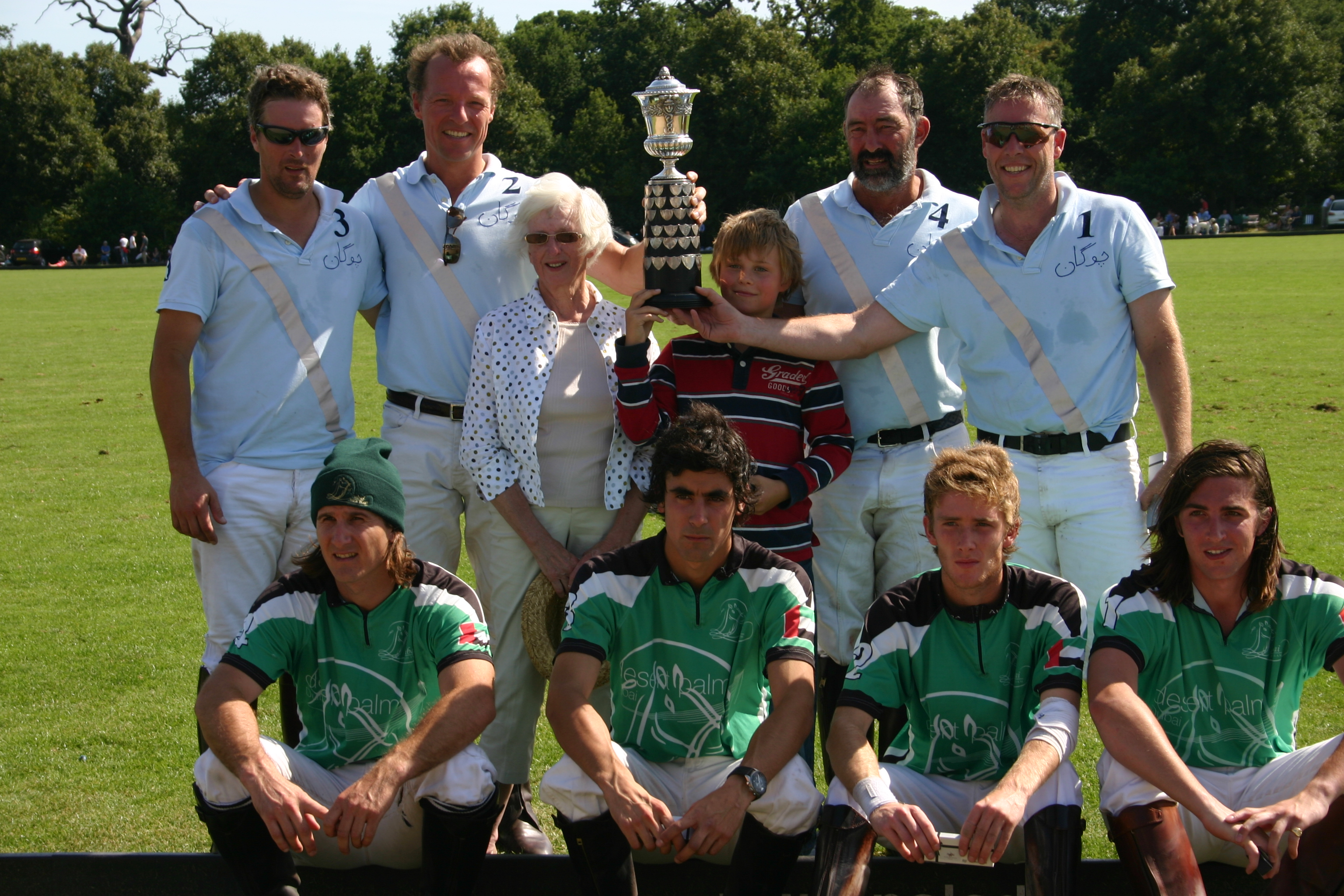
2009 Roehampton Trophy winners Tchogan: Adolfo Casabal, Heiko Voelker, Greg Keyte and Jason Norton. Runners up Dubai Polo Team.

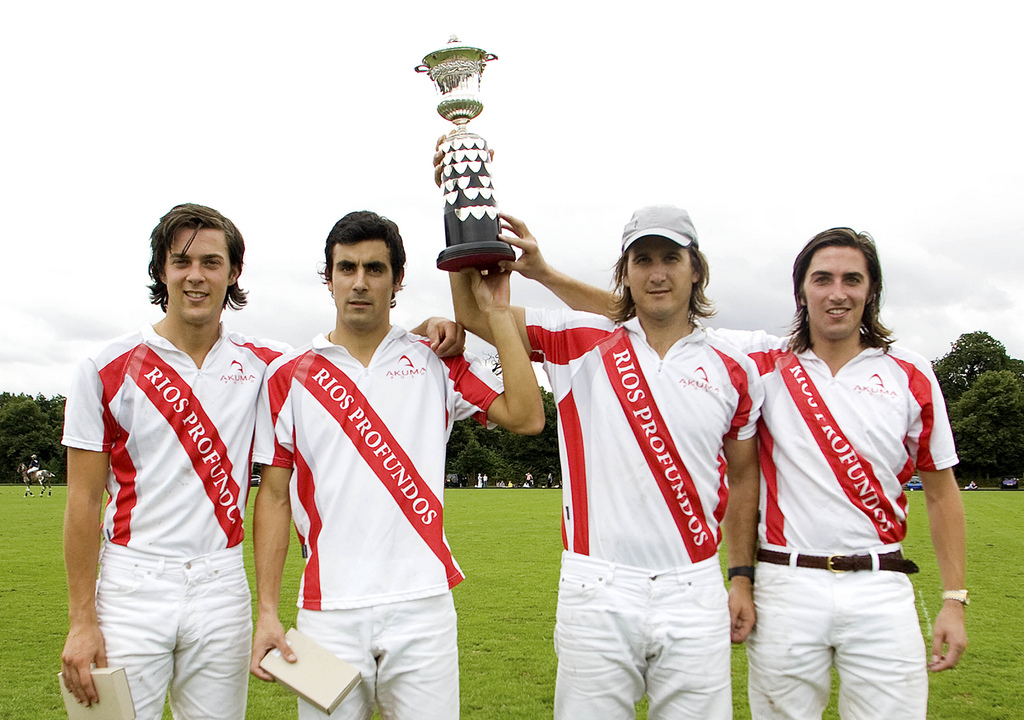
2010 Roehampton Trophy Winners Rios Profundos: Hugo Davis, Matias Machado, Martin Valent and Benjie Davis

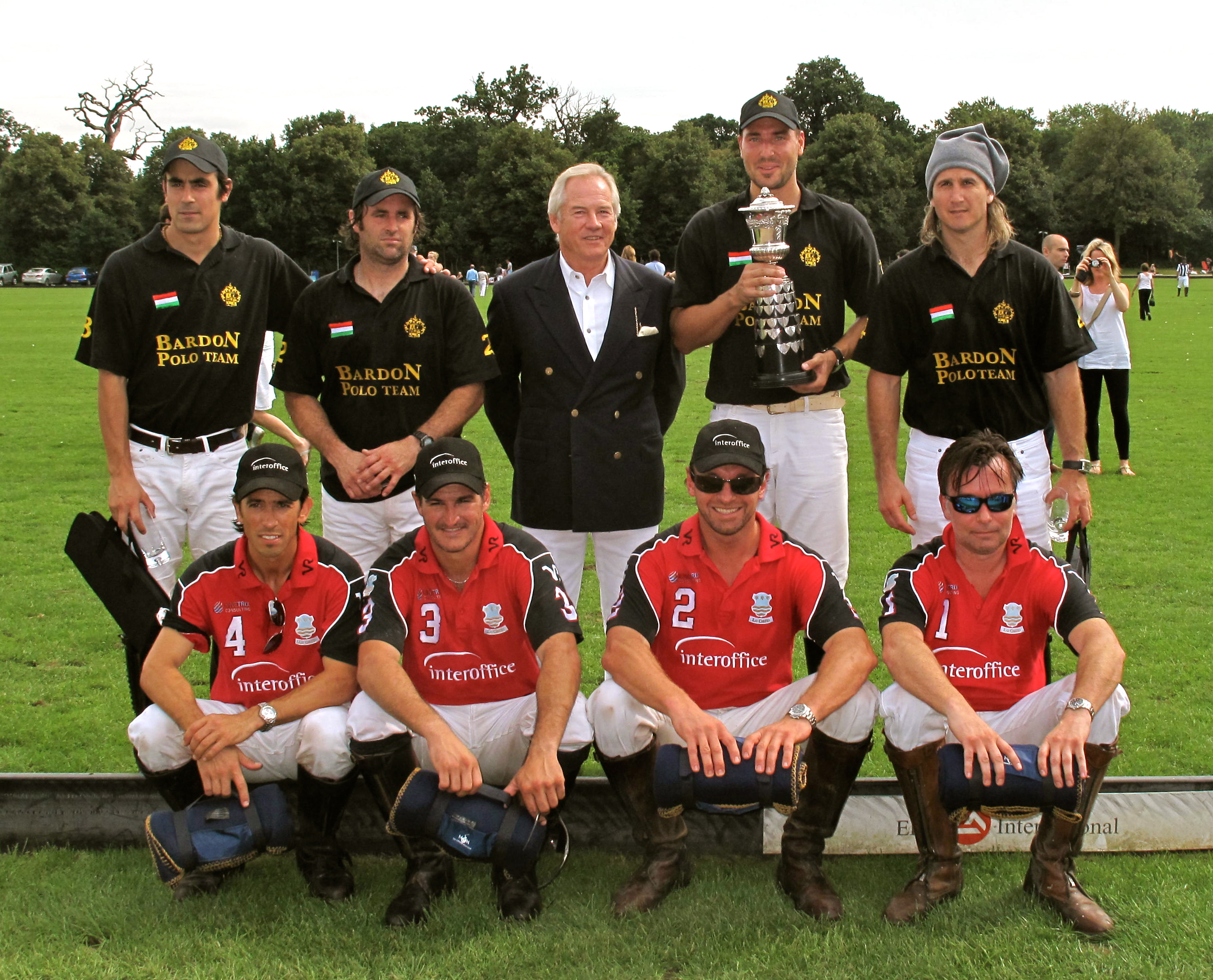
2011 Roehampton Trophy Winners Bardon: Matias Machado, Guillermo Healy, Andras Tombor and Martin Valent. Runners up Interoffice

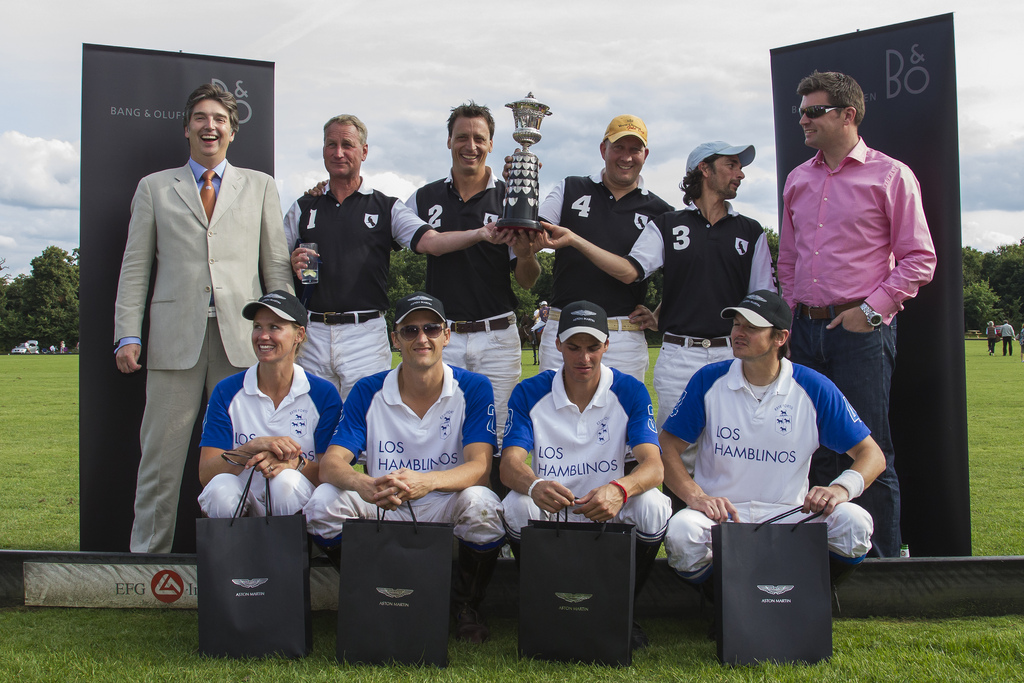
2012 Roehampton Trophy winners Rosario: Mats Ottossom, Martin Roman, Julian Drake and Nico Fontanarossa. Runners up Los Hamblinos.

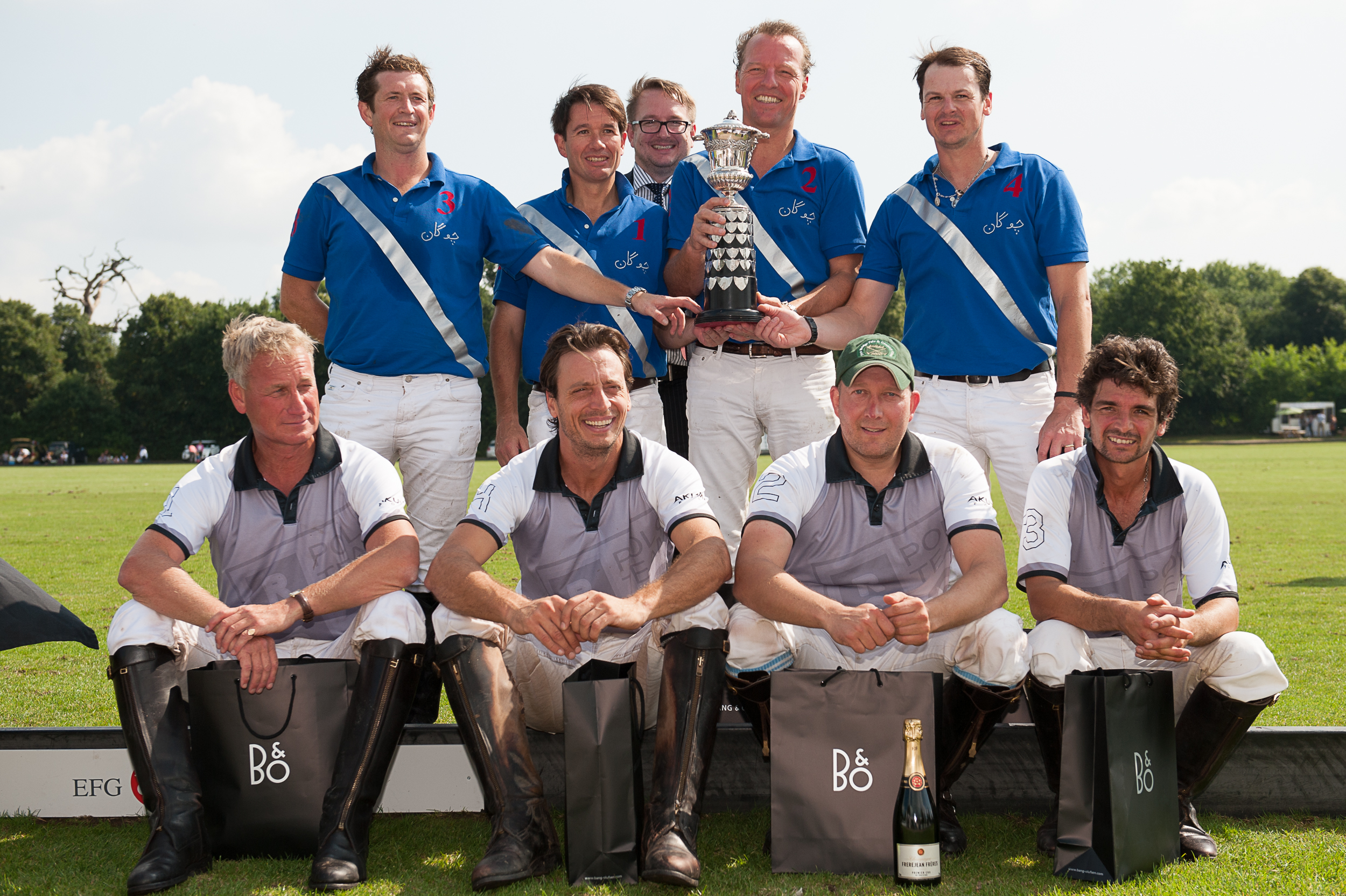
2013 Roehampton Trophy winners Tchogan: Ryan Pembal, Jonathan Hare, Heiko Voelker and Sebastian Dawnay. Runners up Rosario.

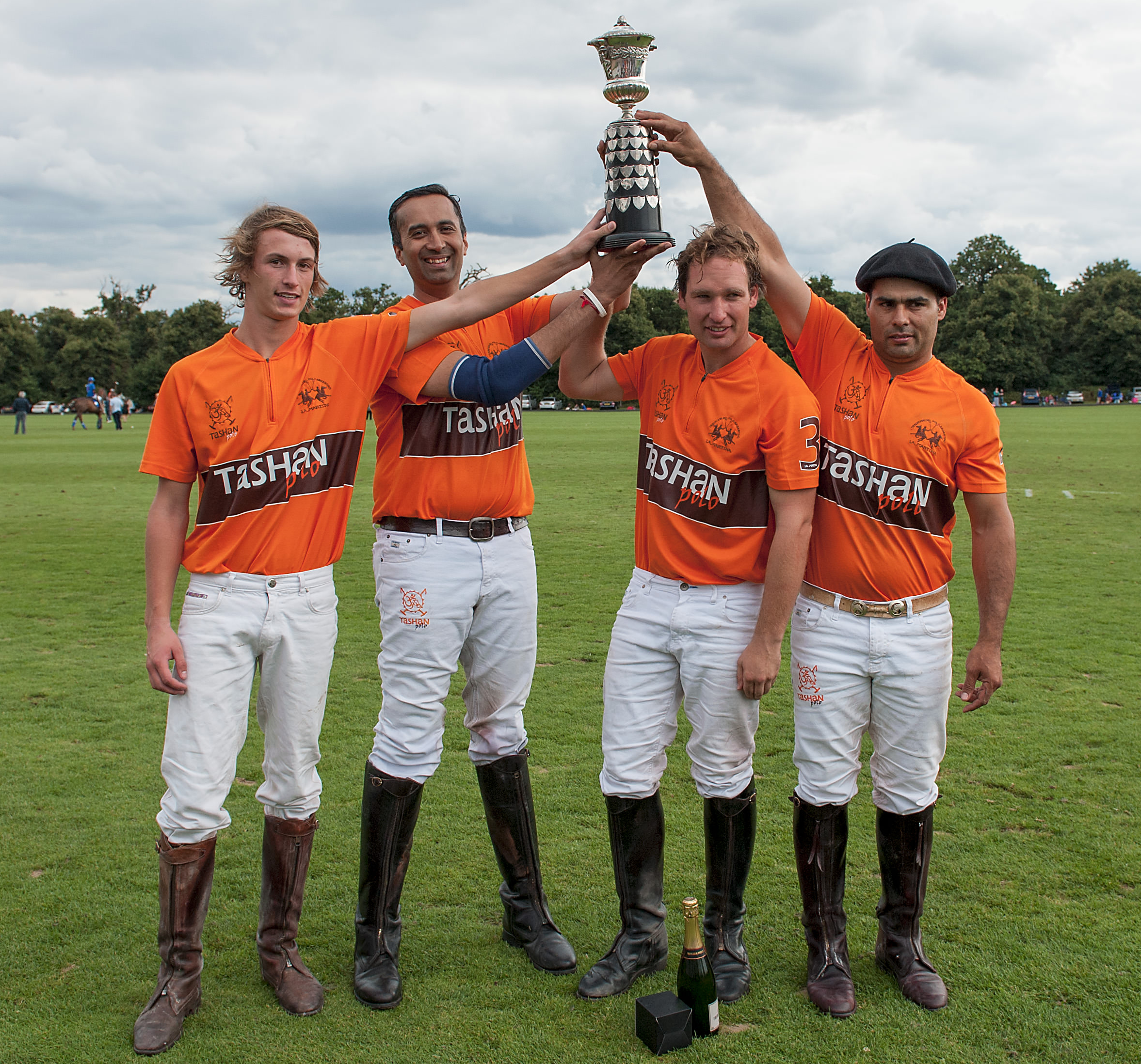
2014 Roehampton Trophy winners Tashan: Alex Webb, Vivek Rawal, Will Emerson and Daniel Otamendi at Ham Polo Club.

Year	Team	Players
1902	Buccaneers	Harold Ernest Brassey; Honorable R. Ward; Frederick C.G. Menzies; Captain George Marjoribanks
1903	Magpies	Captain Leopold Christian Duncan Jenner; Captain Godfrey Heseltine; Captain John Hardress Lloyd; Ulric Oliver Thynne
1904	Students	Cecil Grenfell; Riversdale Grenfell; Morres Nickalls; Patteson Womersley Nickalls
1905	Roehampton	Cecil Grenfell; Riversdale Grenfell; Morres Nickalls; Patteson Womersley Nickalls
1906	Woodpeckers	Captain Herbert Haydon Wilson; Frederick C.G. Menzies; Captain Brownlow Mathew-Lannowe; Captain John Hardress Lloyd
1907	Leopards	Captain Leopold Christian Duncan Jenner; M. C. Pilkington; Morres Nickalls; Captain Claude Champion de Crespigny
1908	Leopards	Captain Leopold Christian Duncan Jenner; Captain Herbert Haydon Wilson; Captain Claude Champion de Crespigny; Honorable Ivor Guest, 1st Viscount Wimborne
1909	Beauchamp Hall	Leopold Christian Duncan Jenner Captain Percy Desmond FitzGerald; Frederick Agnew Gill; Captain C. F. Hunter
1910	Ranelagh	Captain Leopold Christian Duncan Jenner; Frank Brereton Hurndall; Captain P. D. Fitzgerald; Major H. R. Lee
1911	Tigers	Jean de Madre; Captain C. Mac G. Dundar; Ralph Gerald Ritson; Captain Leslie St. Clair Cheape
1912	Wanderers	Captain G. E. Bellville; Major P. D. Fitzgerald; Major E. H. Brassey; Frederick Agnew Gill
1913	Pilgrims	Captain Teignmouth Philip Melvill; Alfred Grisar; Captain Edward Arthur Wienholt; F. Rich
1914	Old Etonians	Geoffrey H. Phipps-Hornby, Sr. Captain John Jacob Astor; Lord Rocksavage; Captain J. F. Harrison
1919	Scouts	Major W. T. Miles; Brigadier General P. D. Fitzgerald; Captain Honorable Frederick Edward Guest; Major Frederick W. Barrett
1920	Roehampton	Captain A. S. Wills; Lieutenant Colonel Hugh C. S. Ashton; Major F. Penn; Lieutenant Colonel Charles Darley Miller
1921	Eastcote	S. Sandford; Earle Hopping; Major Philip Magor; John Arthur Edward Traill
1922	Cirencester	Captain Maurice John Kingscote; Honorable A. Hastings; Captain Richard Reginald Smart; Captain L. Shedden
1923	Cirencester	Captain Maurice John Kingscote; Honorable A. Hastings; Captain Richard Reginald Smart; Captain L. Shedden
1924	Optimists	Honorable K. Mackay; Major H. Colmore; Captain C. Tresmoyne; Major A. L. Tate
1925	La Pampa	Juan Nelson; Marquis de Villavieja; A. M. Pena; John Arthur Edward Traill
1926	Templeton	P. M. Forsyth-Forest; Major Geoffrey H. Phipps-Hornby, Sr. Major Frederick W. Barrett; Captain Frederick Edward Guest
1928	Hurricanes	S. Stanford; Captain Charles Thomas Irvine Roark; Desmond Miller; Major J. F. Harrison
1929	Pilgrims	Captain Maurice John Kingscote; Major Geoffrey H. Phipps-Hornby, Sr. Lieutenant George E. Prior-Palmer; Alfred Grisar
1930	17th-21st Lancers	R. B. Cooke; Desmond Miller; H. Walford; Vivian Noverre Lockett
1931	Hurricanes	S. Sanford; W. Whitebread; Captain Charles Thomas Irvine Roark; Colonel Percival Kinnear Wise
1932	Merchiston	D. J. Frost; H. Hughes; F. H. George; Major Evelyn Fanshawe
1933	Friar Park	A. David; Captain J. Butler; Captain H. G. Morrison; J. Robinson
1934	Panthers	John Crichton, 5th Earl Erne; Major Geoffrey H. Phipps-Hornby, Sr. Eric Horace Tyrrell-Martin; Major Philip Magor
1935	Panthers	Major N. W. Leaf; S. Stanford; Eric Horace Tyrrell-Martin; Captain D. J. Norten
1936	Not Played	
1937	Someries House	Colonel Sir Harold Augustus Wernher; Major Claude Ernest Pert; Captain David Dawnay; Andrew Horsbrugh Porter
1938	Someries House	Colonel Sir Harold Augustus Wernher; Captain Honorable Richard Gustavus Hamilton-Russell; Captain David Dawnay; Captain Andrew Horsbrugh Porter
1939	Pandas	A. David; K. J. Price; Captain J. H. Montagu Douglas-Scott; Major J. F. Harrison
1950	Sussex	A. M. Gibb; Lieutenant Colonel Geoffrey H. Phipps-Hornby, Sr. Lieutenant Colonel Peter W. Dollar; J. Larkin
1951	La Espadana	Juan J. Reynal; Luis H. Garrahan; Juan R. Ross; Carlos B. Buchanan
1952	Friar Park	Major A. David; Lieutenant Colonel Andrew Horsbrugh Porter; Lieutenant Colonel Humphrey Patrick Guinness; William Francis Walsh
1953	Park House	F. L. Withers; E. Lalor; J. R. Ross; J. I. Domecq
1954	Cowdray Park	P. R. Curden; Lieutenant Colonel P. W. Dollar; Ras Rajar Hamit Singh; John Lakin
1955	Grey Hounds	S. Hill; Colonel G. H. Critchley; Lieutenant Colonel Alec Harper; Charles Smith-Ryland
1956	Cowdray Park	Brigadier M. A. Baig; Charles Smith-Ryland; Hanut Singh; J. Lakin
1967	Silver Leys	Alfred G. Boyd Gibbins; Captain Gaje Singh; Luis Sosa Basualdo; C. R. Watt
1972	Squires Farm	G. C. H. Lawson; N. E. Wates; B. Bethell; C. A. Brodie
1974	Toulston	P. Gaunt; R. Rossiter; Lt. Col. K. Singh; J. N. Hinchliffe
1975	Wilmer Cottage	C. Tauchert; Major B. Singh; Captain C. Lowther; S. Houston
1976	The Bees	R. Maple-Brown; Bryan Morrison; B. D. Arbeid; M. Emmerson
1977	Invicta	D. Fernandez; C. C. Tauchert; D. T. Copeland; R. A. Houston
1979	Travelwise Tortugas	W. Healy; C. Tauchert; J. J. Diaz Alberdi; D. Fernandez
1981	Equus	Q. P. Davis; M. Willoughby; W. Roberts; D. I. Anderson
1983	The Watergate	N. Lobel; G. C. H. Lawson; M. Glue; D. Anderson
1986	Maidford	J. N. Williams; E. P. Marriage; D. T. Copeland; D. A. Brown
1994	Freebooters	R. Barnes; P. Bannister; P. McCormack; C. Graham
1995	Redcliffe Square	D. Christian; S. Allen; M. Ventura; T. Healy
1996	Dubai Exiles	Peter McCormack; Neil McLean; Martin Glue; Steven Lamprell
1997	Twelve Oaks	I. Wooldridge; G. Wooldridge; John Horswell; N. Brister
1998	Tournament Canceled for Rain	
1999	Black Cats	M. Wadhwa; T. Phillimore; N. Hancock; M. L. Ward
2000	Ravenscourt	Jinni Featherstone-Witty; A. Blake-Thomas; O. Mancini; S. McLaren-Tosh
2001	Regal	R. Singh; S. Baselli; T. Southwell; M. Stegman
2002	Los Pinguinos	Mark Persaud; Alan Ruzzamam; Martin fFrench-Blake; Sam Gardner
2003	Clarita	Clare Mathias; Sam Gardner; James Lucas; Chris Mathias
2004	Clarita	Clare Mathias; Chris Mathias; Sam Gardner; James Lucas
2005	Clarita	Clare Mathias; Chris Mathias; Sam Gardner; Corin Gibbs
2006	Montana Polo	Tony Gerrard; Martin Roman; Ariel Tapia; Adam Leech
2007	Los Dientes	Matthew Tooth; Lucas Fernandez; Sebastian Dawnay; Oscar Mancini
2008	Avalon Polo	Christopher Caesar; J. A. Schlesinger; Nicolas Talamoni; Greg Keyte
2009	Tchogan	Jason Norton; Heiko Voelker; Nico Talamoni (injured during play); Adolfo Casabal; Greg Keyte
2010	Rios Profundos	Hugo Davis; Benjie Davis; Matias Machado; Martin Valent
2011	Bardon	Andras Tombor; Guillermo Healy; Matias Machado; Martin Valent
2012	Rosario	Mats Ottossom; Martin Roman; Nico Fontanarossa; Julian Drake
2013	Tchogan	Ryan Pembal; Jonathan Hare; Heiko Voleker; Sebastian Dawnay
2014	Tashan Polo	Vivek Rawal; Alex Webb; Will Emerson; Daniel Otamendi
2015	Harum Scarum	Mel Hare; Jonathan Hare; Roddy Mathews; Daniel Otamendi
2016	Snake Bite	Max Kirchhoff; Tom Meyrick; Jack Berner; David Ashby
2017	Jet Set	Katherine Smithwick; Tom Brodie; Juan Cruz Araya Martelli; Timor Nadine
2018	Ojo Caliente	Ana Escoveda; Georgina Brittan; Ed Banner-Eve; Jonny Good
2019	Cani	Louise Jebson; Celio Garcera; Jack Aldridge; Matias Amaya
2020	Ojo Caliente/Mount Loftus	Ana Escoveda; Georgina Brittan; Terrence Lent; Jonny Good
2021	Quel Domage	Toby Bradshaw; Hector Worsley; Hugh Humfrey; David Ashby
2022	Mount Loftus/Winkfield Park	Georgina Brittan; Rob Wilson; Josh Clover; Jonny Good
2023	Mount Loftus/Los Cariocas	Georgina Brittan; Tarsis Goncalves; Richard Blake-Thomas; Jonny Good
2024	The Mirror	Sarkis Gabrelian; Bella Lavinia; Josh Hydes; Nico Roberts
2025	Mount Loftus	Georgina Brittan; Quinn Ainsley; Ross Ainsley; Jonny Good
2026	Mount Loftus	Georgina Brittan; Patrick Harrisson; Benji Mancini; Jonny Good

== The Trophy ==
The Silver Trophy itself, donated by Mrs Alison Cunninghame of Craigends, stands 53 cm high. The cup is detachable from the base section, this has caused trouble with over excited winning teams at presentations and as a result the trophy has a slight lean. The trophy also has a detachable lid though it has not been traditional in recent years to drink champagne from the trophy as a celebration.

Under the handles of the Trophy are the faces of two polo players wearing polo hats with wings, the trophy also bears an unhidden Hallmark on its front.

Not including the years that Britain was at war and the trophy was not played for, there are 35 years missing from the base including 1947, the first year it was won by Ham Polo Club.
