= Johnny Traill =

Irish–Argentine polo player

John Arthur Edward Traill
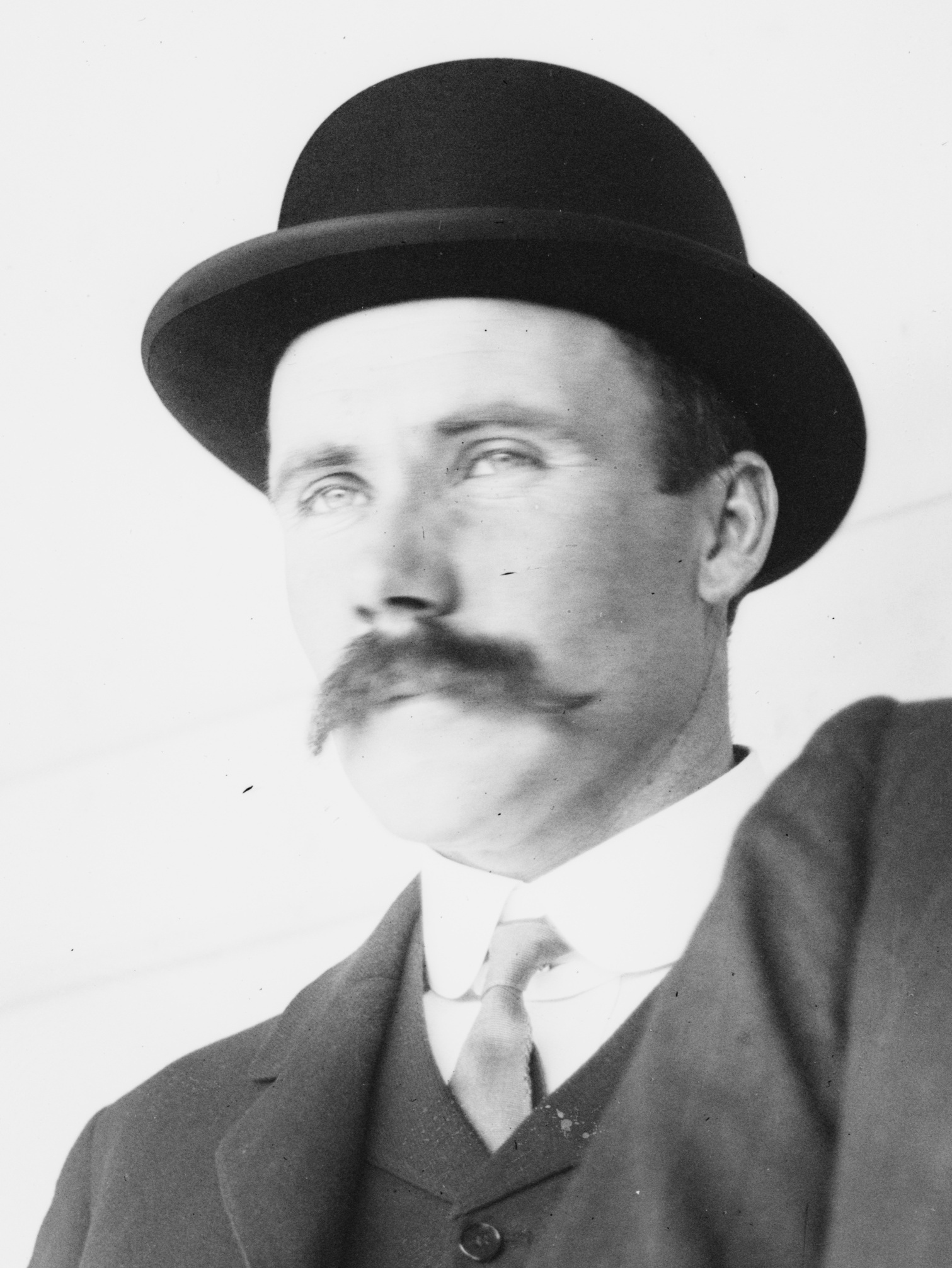
- Traill on 4 June 1914 at the International Polo Cup
- Born: John Arthur Edward Traill; 8 December 1882; London, England
- Died: 1958 (aged 75–76)
- Known for: polo player with a ten goal handicap

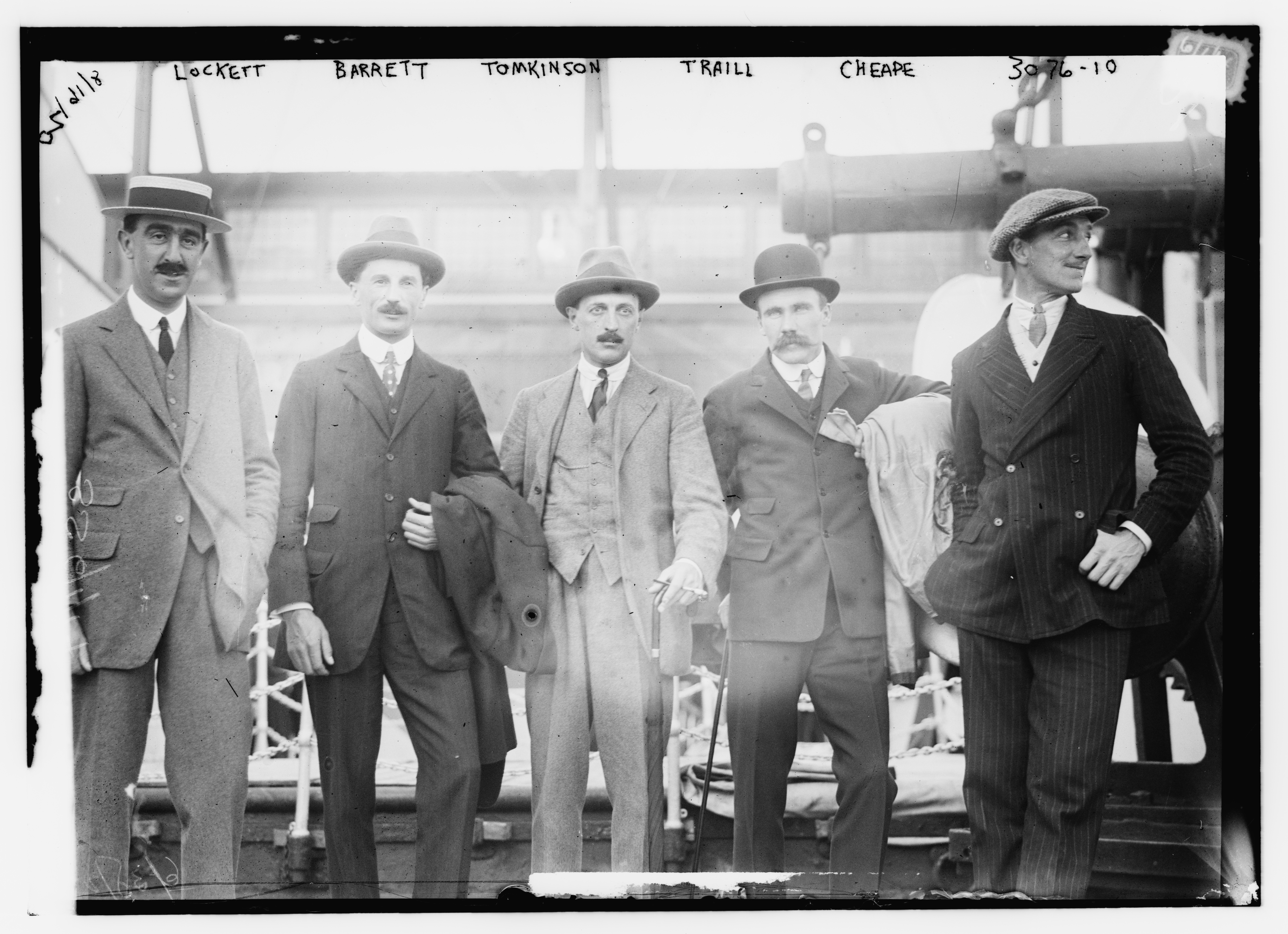
Lockett, Barrett, Tomkinson, Traill, Cheape pictured in 1914

John Arthur Edward Traill (1882–1958) was the first Irish–Argentine 10-goal polo player.

He was born in London 1882. Traill was a member of an old Anglo-Irish landed family, settled in County Down. All of his siblings were born in Argentina, on the family estancia ‘La Esterlina’, in the north of Santa Fe province.

In 1913 Traill became the first to obtain the maximum handicap in Argentina of ten goals.

He married Henrietta Margaret, from Scotland, and they had children John and James.

In the 1920s, he settled in England, where he had a distinguished career and was considered one of the best players of the era. He won numerous tournaments, such as the Ranelagh Championship in London, the Westchester Championship in New York.

Traill owned a ranch in Argentina and imported polo ponies for the Roehampton Club, training them in Richmond Park. He was also a coach at Ham Polo Club when it was revived by Billy Walsh. His name appears as winner of the Roehampton Trophy several times, alongside teammates such as the Marquess of Villavieja, Jack Nelson and Major Philip Magor.

Traill won the Argentine Open ten times during his career.

He died in 1958.
