= Geoffrey Phipps-Hornby =

Geoffrey Phipps-Hornby may refer to:

- Geoffrey Hardinge Phipps-Hornby (1889–1967), British Army officer and polo player
- Geoffrey Stanley Phipps-Hornby (1856–1927), British Army officer and polo player

== See also ==
- Geoffrey Hornby (Geoffrey Thomas Phipps Hornby, 1825–1895), Royal Navy officer
