= Horswell =

Horswell is a surname. Notable people with the surname include:

- John Horswell, English polo player and coach
- Micky Horswell (born 1953), English footballer

== See also ==
- Horsewell
