= Roehampton Club =

Sports club in Roehampton, southwest London, England

Coordinates: 51°27′48.08″N 0°14′45.1″W

Roehampton Club is a private members’ sports club in southwest London, England. It is set in 100 acres (400,000 m^{2}) of parkland, close to Richmond Park. Originally established in 1901 as an officers’ polo club, Roehampton Club has facilities including golf, tennis, squash, croquet, and swimming.

== Early history ==
At the turn of the 19th century there was a tremendous strain on the polo clubs of London to provide for the growing interest in the sport. Clubs existed in the vicinity of the capital but were considered to be too far to travel. It was the initiative of the Miller brothers that began the formation of Roehampton Club to alleviate this problem. Edward Miller had left the 17th Lancers in 1893 to start Rugby Polo Club at his home in Warwickshire. His brothers Ted, Charles (an Olympic polo player) and George had developed one of the largest polo pony supply businesses in Europe. Together they met with the other interested parties and formed a Limited Liability company to create the club. Lord Shrewsbury was appointed as the chairman and Adolphus Cambridge, 1st Marquess of Cambridge was made president.

Charles Darley Miller set out to find the land which needed to be close to the Hurlingham Club and Ranelagh Club for ease of transportation of polo ponies. The original facilities included three polo grounds, a racecourse, a horse show ground, an area where women could practice driving, tilting and jumping and stabling for the members horses. in 1904 a golf course was built with nine holes, this was later expanded to 18.

Roehampton Club opened in April 1902 under the management of Charles Darley Miller. The Roehampton Trophy, donated by Mrs Alison Cunninghame of Craigends, was first played for in this year. The Trophy is now the oldest polo trophy played for in England and the tournament is held at Ham Polo Club in Richmond, London. There were also Junior competitions and a tournament where all the players and teams were selected by ladies. The cups were presented to the ladies who picked the winning team.

In 1913 Olive Hockin started a fire at the Club in support of the suffragette movement. Hockin was arrested as she was also suspected of an arson attack on a house at Walton Heath belonging to Lloyd George. Hockin was given a four-month sentence in Holloway Prison.

The first 400 Members paid no entrance fee and though the Club was considered to be a poor relation to the Hurlingham and Ranelagh clubs this was not the case. Members and regular polo players included Admiral Lord David Beatty, Sir Winston Churchill, the Marques de Villavieja, Lord Hugh Salisbury, the Grand Duke Mikhail Mikhailovich, and the Duke of Westminster. King Alfonso XIII of Spain was so fond of playing at the club he paid for a grandstand to be built on top of the clubhouse for his entourage to use.

== Notable polo players ==
- Charles Thomas Irvine Roark
- Eric Horace Tyrrell-Martin
- John Arthur Edward Traill

== See also ==
- List of London's gentlemen's clubs
- Roehampton Invitation Tournament
