= Valent =

Valent may refer to:

- Valent (name)
- Valence (chemistry)
- Valency (linguistics)

== See also ==
- Valnet
