= Magor (surname) =

Magor is a surname. Notable people with the surname include:

- Doug Magor (1947–1969), Australian footballer
- Frank Magor (1886–1951), Australian footballer
- Liz Magor (born 1948), Canadian artist
- Philip Magor (1881–1971), British polo player
