= Maurice John Kingscote =

British polo player

Captain Maurice John Kingscote (30 July 1887 – 5 June 1959) was a British polo champion.

== Biography ==
He was born on 30 July 1887. He was the son of Thomas Arthur Fitzhardinge Kingscote and Evelyn Mary Gifford.

He won the Roehampton Trophy in 1922, 1923 and 1929. He died on 5 June 1959 in a car accident.

== Family ==
Kingscote was married three time, the first two marriages ending in divorce:

- He married Violet Owen Lord, and had a daughter Joyce Kingscote, who married Lieutenant-colonel Sir Hugh Trefusis Brassey. Maurice and Violet divorced in 1936.
- He married Kathleen Sarah Vestey, daughter of Samuel Vestey, 2nd Baron Vestey and Frances Sarah Howarth.
- He married June Darby Philips in 1947, and had a son, Michael John Fitzhardinge Kingscote (born 1950).
