= George Meyrick =

English polo player

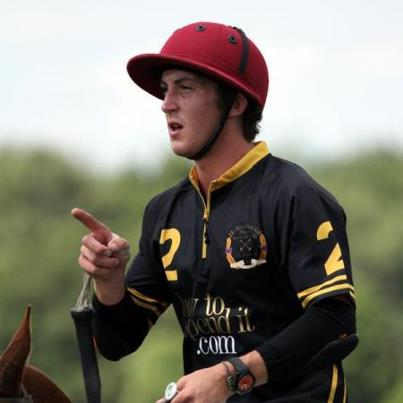

Personal information
- Born: March 26, 1988 (age 38)

Sport
- Sport: Polo
- Turned pro: 2006
- Updated on 3 June 2013

George Meyrick (born March 26, 1988) is a professional English polo player with a six-goal UK and Argentinian handicap.

== Biography ==
George Meyrick turned professional in 2006 and in 2007 was selected to play for the High-Goal team Dubai where he played alongside Adolfo Cambiaso, considered one of the best polo players ever to have played the game. During his time with Dubai, Meyrick won the Queen’s Cup and reached the final of the Gold Cup before a broken foot kept him out of the game for two years.

After early recognition during the HPA fast-track scheme and then in the young England squad, at just 15 years old, Meyrick became the youngest player ever to compete in an adult England team, winning the European Tournament in the World Cup in his first season, and then again four years later. In 2012 Meyrick represented England against the Commonwealth at Beaufort in the Audi International Series and represented England in the 2013 World Cup in China.

Commercially George Meyrick has become one of the most recognised faces in British Polo having worked with brands including Matt Roberts Personal Training, Billecart-Salmon Champagne, Kennett Watches, Dukes Boots, Coast Clothing and MacWet among others. George has also appeared in a wide range of magazines including Tatler, The Polo Magazine, Polo Times and Billionaire Magazine among many others.

== Management Career ==
George embarked on a career of High-Goal team management and in 2026 took the position of Director of Polo Operations at Ham Polo Club in Richmond, London.
