= Jackson baronets of Stansted House (1902) =

Baronetcy of the United Kingdom

The Jackson Baronetcy, of Stansted House, Stansted in the County of Essex, was created in the Baronetage of the United Kingdom on 24 July 1902 for Sir Thomas Jackson, Chief Manager of the Hong Kong and Shanghai Bank from 1876.

== Jackson baronets, of Stansted House (1902) ==
- Sir Thomas Jackson, 1st Baronet (1841–1915)
- Sir Thomas Dare Jackson, 2nd Baronet (1876–1954). A Brigadier-General in the British Army, he fought in the Second Boer War and the First World War.
- Sir George Julius Jackson, 3rd Baronet (1883–1956)
- Sir (Walter David) Russell Jackson, 4th Baronet (1890–1956)
- Sir Michael Roland Jackson, 5th Baronet (1919–2016)
- Sir Thomas St Felix Jackson, 6th Baronet (born 1946)

There is no heir to the title.

== Notes ==
Baronetage of the United Kingdom
Preceded by Porter baronets	Jackson baronets of Stansted House; 24 July 1902	Succeeded by Laking baronets
