= George Marjoribanks =

British polo player and banker

Captain Sir George John Marjoribanks KCVO (27 March 1856 – 11 November 1931) was a British polo player and banker.

== Biography ==
Marjoribanks was born in London into a prominent banking family, the eldest surviving son of Edward Majoribanks Jr. He was educated at Eton College followed by Christ Church, Oxford, but returned home to begin working before obtaining a degree. He rose to become the chairman of the Coutts Bank in 1923, following in the footsteps of his father, Edward Majoribanks Jr., and grandfather Edward Majoribanks Sr. The families continuing involvement in banking originates from Sir George's great-grandfather Edward being a close friend of Thomas Coutts. His father's younger brother was Dudley Marjoribanks, 1st Baron Tweedmouth.

Sir George was a keen polo player and was on the first winning team of the Roehampton Trophy in 1902. He was knighted for his services to the British financial industry.

In 1895, he married May Montague Cécile Hatch. They had a daughter, Monica Marie Fenella Marjoribanks, and another daughter who died in childhood. He died at his Lees estate, Coldstream, Berwickshire, Scotland.
