= RSPCA Reform Group =

Campaign for change within the RSPCA

The Royal Society for the Prevention of Cruelty to Animals (RSPCA) Reform Group was founded in 1970 by members of the British RSPCA who were frustrated by the organization's inability, as they saw it, to deal effectively with the issues raised by factory farming, animal testing, and hunting. The group was particularly concerned that pro-hunting members were attempting to prevent the society from expressing opposition to bloodsports; several of them had said they would lobby to have the RSPCA's charitable status removed if it campaigned against hunting.

The Reform Group was led by Brian Seager, John Bryant, and Stanley Cover, and the aim was to secure the election to the 46-member RSPCA Council of Seager, Bryant, and other supporters of the group's more radical agenda, including Andrew Linzey, the Oxford theologian, and Richard D. Ryder, the Oxford psychologist who coined the term speciesism.

Ryder writes that, from then until 1978, the Reform Group succeeded in changing the RSPCA from an organization that had come to focus mostly on companion animals – despite its own radical 19th-century roots – to one that opposed bloodsports, developed comprehensive animal welfare policies, and focused more on farming, animal testing, and wildlife. Ryder became vice-chairman of the RSPCA Council in 1976, then chairman from 1977 to 1979.

== Protests ==
Members of the RSPCA Reform Group have led protests against RSPCA officials that advocate blood sports. In April 1971, Hilda Owen of the RSPCA Reform Group staged a protest demonstration in Leamington contesting the re-election of Charles Smith-Ryland as president of the South and East Warwickshire branch of the RSPCA. Two months later, the RSPCA Reform Group reported success as the South and East Warwickshire branch had voted to remove the president position.
