= Valent (name) =

Valent is both a surname and a given name, derived from the name Valentine. Notable people with the name include:

- Aaron Valent (born 1997), German politician
- Dacia Valent (1963–2015), Italian politician
- Dmitry Valent (born 1988), Belarusian kickboxer
- Eric Valent (born 1977), American baseball player and coach
- Géjza Valent (born 1953), Czech discus thrower
- Martin Valent, Argentine polo player
- Michal Valent (born 1986), Slovak ice hockey player
- Roman Valent (born 1983), Swiss tennis player
- Valent Sinković (born 1988), Croatian rower
