= Ham Polo Club =

Sports venue in London, England

Coordinates: 51.445131°N 0.310034°W

- Type: Sports and social club
- Location: Petersham Road, Richmond, London, TW10 7AH, England
- Founded: 1926; 100 years ago
- Colours: Burgundy and White
- Activities: Polo, horse riding, restaurant, picnicking
- Chairman: The Board of Directors
- General Manager: Shaun Edwardes
- Director of Polo Operations: George Meyrick
- Honorary President: Bakhtiyar Pataudi
- Website: hampoloclub.com

Ham Polo Club is a Hurlingham Polo Association polo club situated in Richmond in the London Borough of Richmond upon Thames, south-west London, England. It is one of the oldest polo clubs in the United Kingdom and the last surviving club in London. The club occupies a location between Richmond Park and the River Thames overlooked by Ham House, eight miles from Hyde Park Corner. The club's facilities include three polo fields (two boarded), a stick and ball field, an exercise track, livery service, coaching and a members' clubhouse with a restaurant and bar which is managed by Ham Polo Club's own catering department. Polo is played at Ham Polo Club between May and September. The club has around 70 playing members and several hundred social members.

The club organises polo games and practices through the week and tickets can be purchased by spectators for Friday, Saturday and Sunday games.

== History ==
Ham Polo Club is the last remaining of the many clubs that existed as satellites to London's 'Big Three' – Ranelagh, Hurlingham and Roehampton. The club began life as the Ham Common Polo Club in 1926, with one full sized ground and two smaller rounds. The first ground was next door to Brown Gates House, Church Road, Ham Common, home of the first chairman, Loftus Storey.

The full-sized ground lay between Richmond Gates and Sheen and a regular coach there was Johnny Traill, the first Argentine 10 goaler, who lived at nearby Roehampton. Ham Common Polo Club, together with Stoke d'Abernon and clubs such as Worcester Park, Kingsbury and Crystal Palace, was ideal for Londoners who did not compete in the major tournaments at the 'Big Three' but who played for the fun of the game. The 1939 season was necessarily the last for the next six years.

Ham was revived in 1946 largely by the efforts of William "Billy" Francis Walsh (1907–1992). On returning from service in the Army, Walsh found that Captain Tom Brigg, the owner of the stables where he had worked, had died and the stables were on the market. Using his gratuity Walsh bought the stables and began offering a livery service to club members. Loftus Storey returned as club Chairman, formed a committee, appointed Billy as Polo Manager and Ham Polo Club was revived under HPA rules. It is widely believed that Lord Cowdray, Arthur Lucas and Billy Walsh were the trio who rescued polo in the United Kingdom after the war.

The first post-war English polo tournament was held at Roehampton in 1947 and the Ham Polo Club team carried off the premier trophy the Roehampton Cup (now played for at Ham). Three years later the club began using a field adjacent to Ham House for matches. Then in 1954, George Stevens, The Dysart families' tenant at Ham House Farm' agreed to turn the Ham House orchard into a polo field for the club.

The first president of the club was Major Archie David the patron of the Friars Park team. The Autumn cup which he presented is still played for annually at Ham. Johnny Traill became a familiar figure at the club and Edward Tauchert Rescued the Roehampton Trophy from the Roehampton Golf Club.

In 1970, thanks largely to the efforts of the then president Sir David Brown, the club purchased the freehold of the land. Sixteen years later land adjacent was purchased and the club gained another ground. In 1982, at the age of seventy, Billy Walsh retired as manager of the club to become president. He was succeeded by two further generations managing Ham Polo Club, Peggy, his daughter and Tim, his grandson.

The club continues to play polo between May and September, managed by George Meyrick. The current president is Bakhtiyar Pataudi. The club currently does not have a chairman, it is chaired collectively by the Board of Directors.

== Flagship tournaments ==
A number of tournaments run throughout the season at Ham Polo Club. The flagship tournaments are the Summer tournament (0–4 goal), The Roehampton Trophy (6 goal) and the Billy Walsh Tournament (0–2 goal).

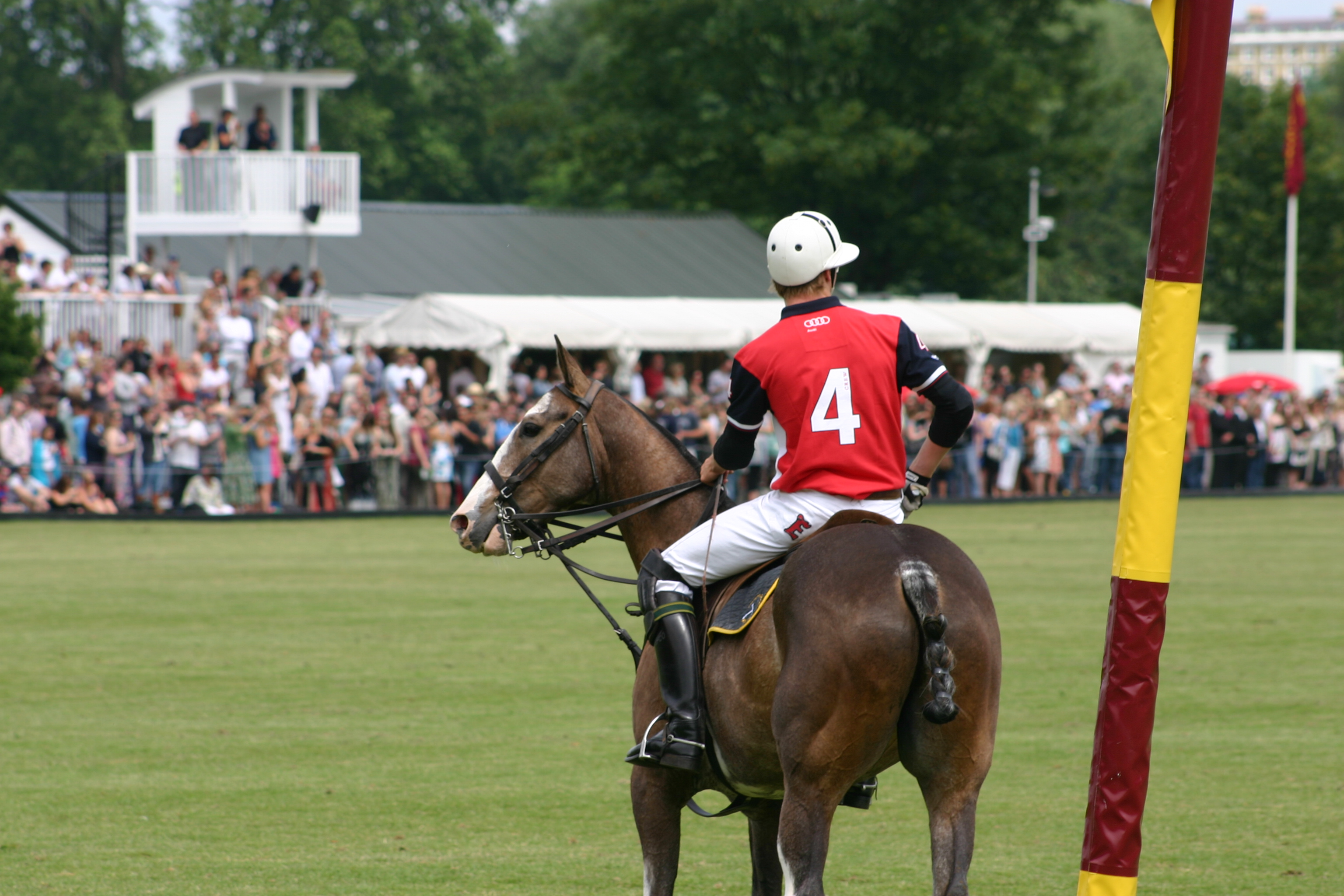
England back Eden Ormerod at the Toast New Zealand International match

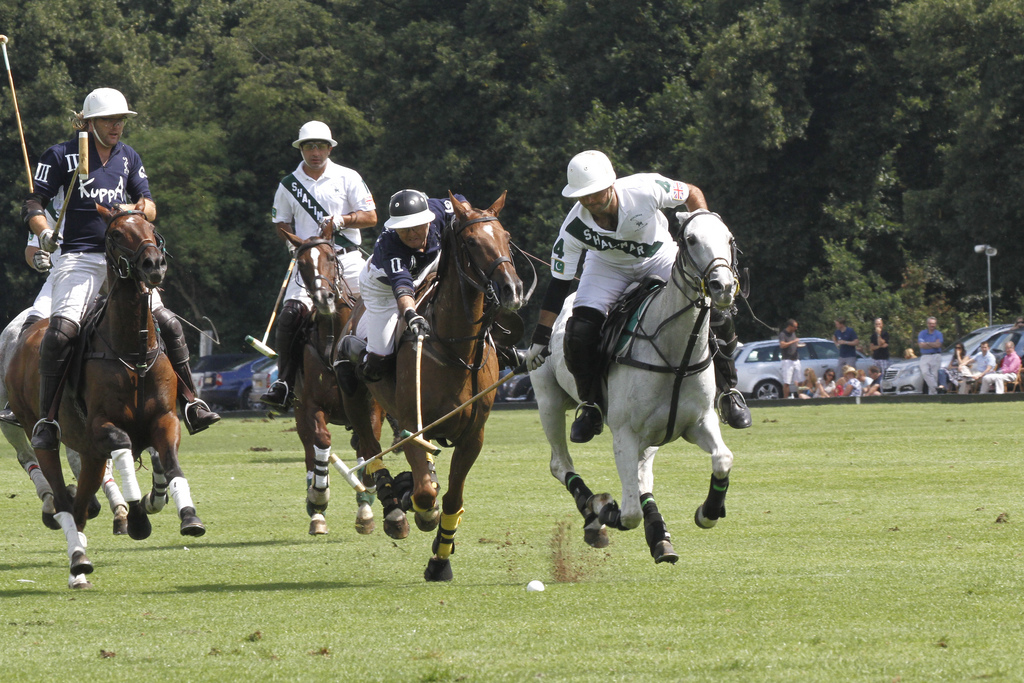
Hissam Ali Haider and Marco Forcaccia in The Dubai Trophy final

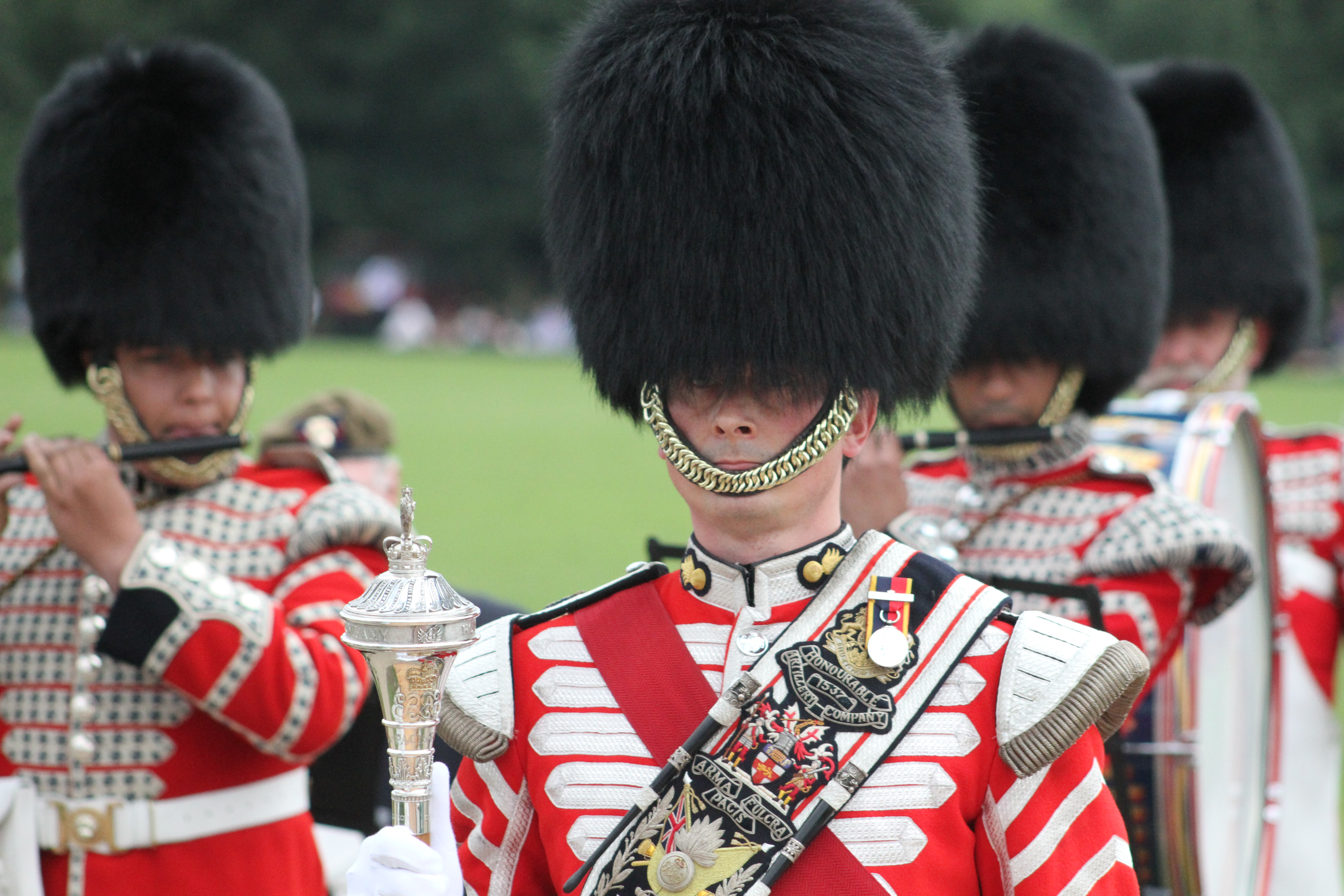
Honourable Artillery Company corps of drums at the HAC polo day

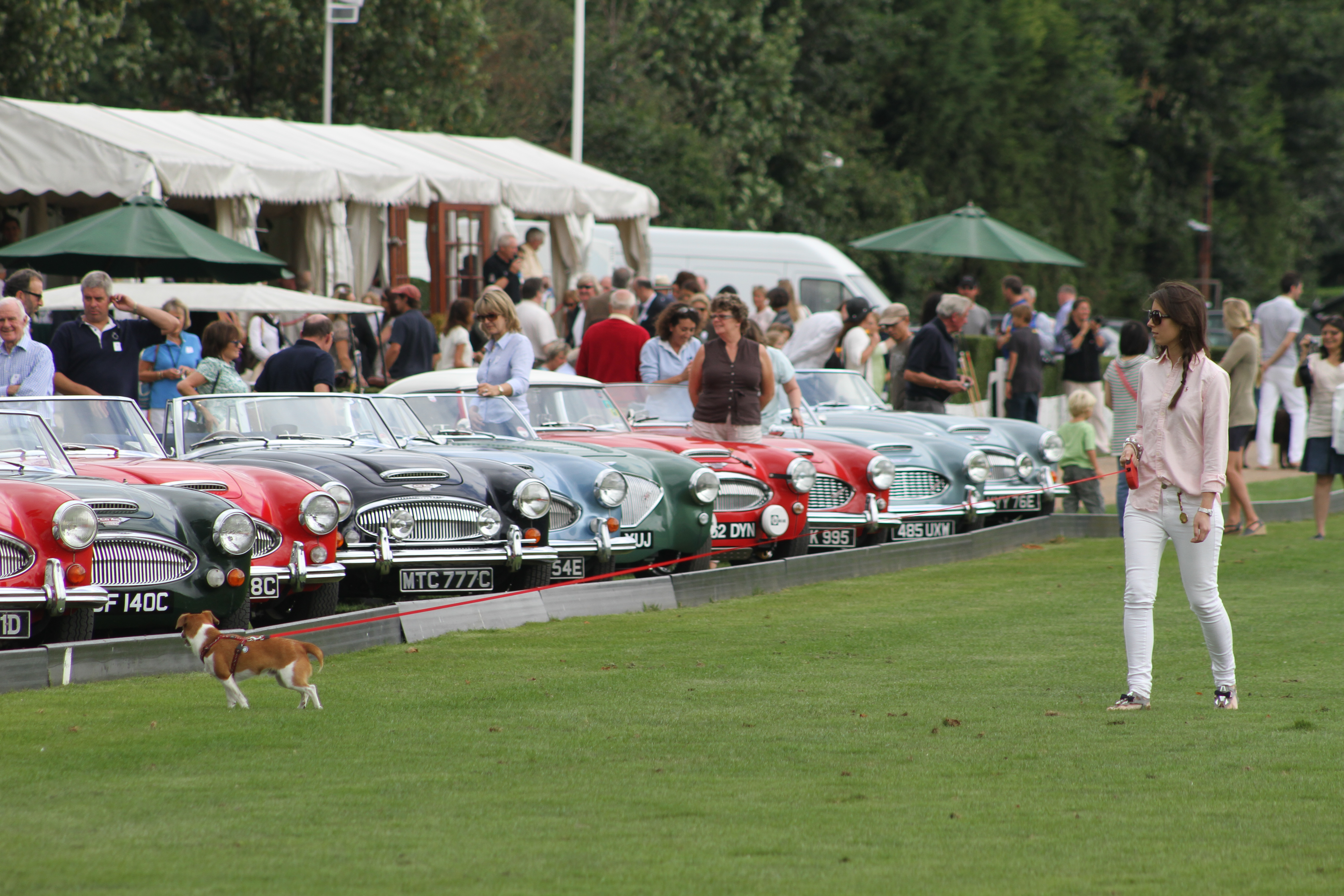
Display of Austin Healey classic British Sports Cars at Roehampton Trophy finals day

== Membership ==
The number of playing members is limited and applicants must be interviewed by the committee. Social membership entitles individuals or families to use the clubhouse facilities on match days as well as being invited to the club's social functions. Academy membership is also available and a Junior category for young players.

== Grounds and Playing Facilities ==
Ham Polo Club has occupied its current 28 acre site since 1950, after moving from the original site it had occupied from 1926 to 1949. At the current site the club's land includes two full size polo grounds and additionally a grass stick & ball area. Ground 1 at Ham Polo Club is surrounded by lawned picnic areas for spectators. In 2026 the club completed construction of a full size all weather polo arena for use playing winter polo. Players are also provided with a gym and a wooden horse cage for practice.

The club also has access to two further playing fields in Richmond Park.

On the club land there are stables for 120 polo ponies as well as tack rooms, wash down areas, feed rooms and turnout paddocks.

== Charity ==
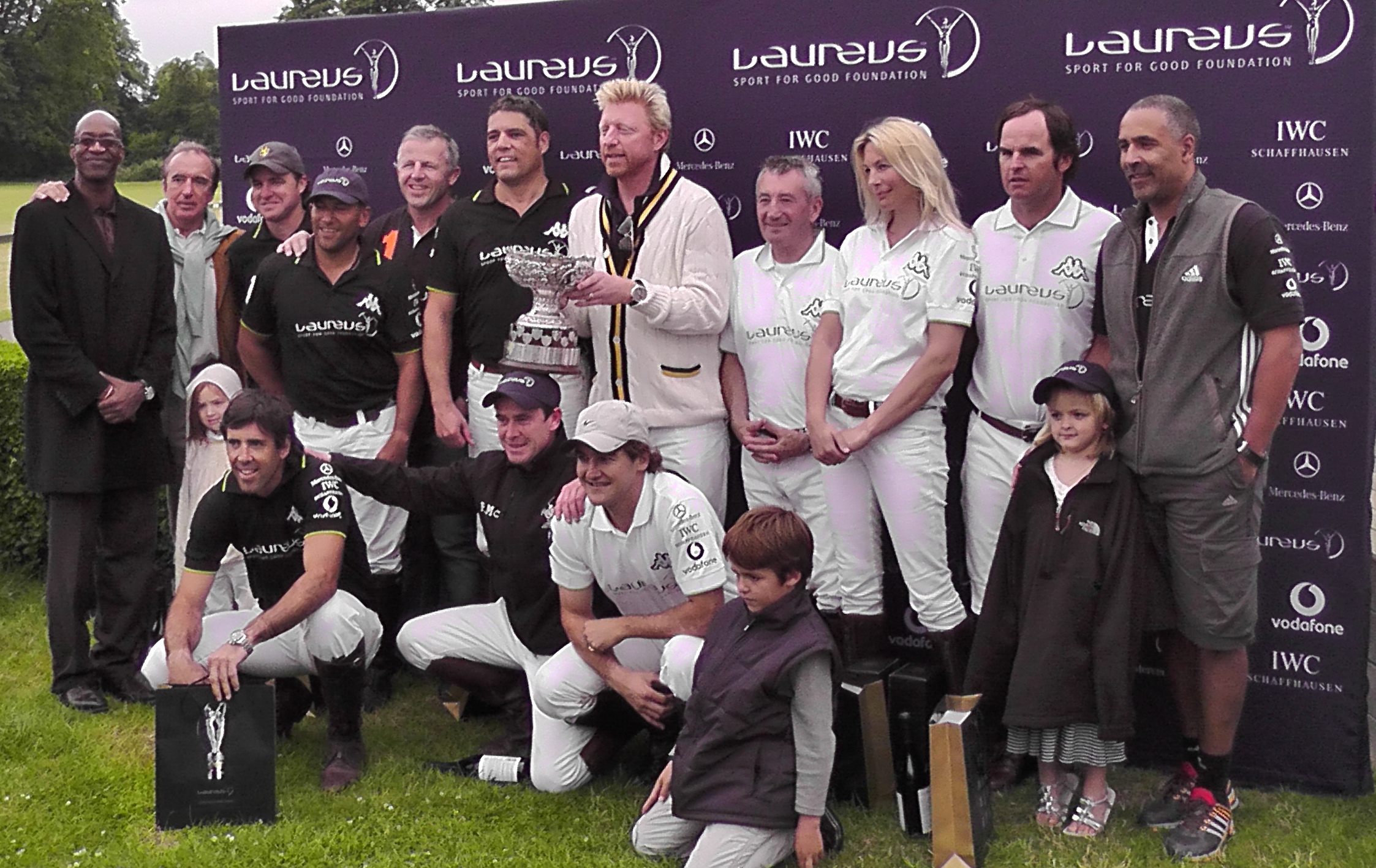
Laureus Sporting Foundation Presentation with Boris Becker

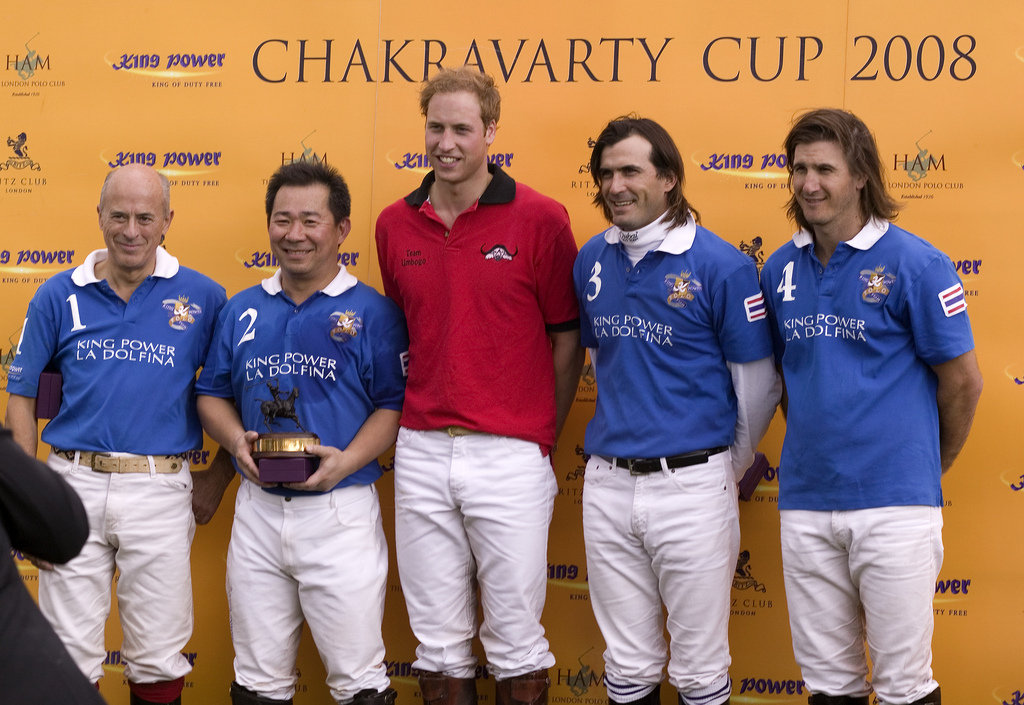
Chakravarty Cup Presentation: Paul Barry, Vichai Raksriaksorn, HRH Prince William, Adolfo Cambiaso and Martin Valent

Ham Polo Club has helped raise almost £2 million for charity over the last few years. Several main charitable events are run each year.

ChildLine Sundown Polo Challenge

On a Saturday evening in June each year a polo match, dinner and charity auction is held to raise funds for the ChildLine organisation. Patron of the charity Esther Rantzen is always present alongside a host of celebrity guests.

Laureus Sport for Good Foundation

The Laureus Sport for Good Foundation works with millions of underprivileged children worldwide. An event takes place annually, this year a number of Laureus ambassadors were in attendance including Edwin Moses, Hugo Porta, Sean Fitzpatrick, Daley Thompson and Boris Becker.

Chakravarty Cup

For many years the Chakravarty cup was held at Ham Polo Club. The event, started in 1997, raises funds for the charities and foundations supported by The Royal Family. The Prince of Wales took part in the match for nine years; now he has retired, his sons The Duke of Cambridge and The Duke of Sussex take part.

== Notable members ==
- Elle Macpherson, Australian model, businesswoman, television host and actress
- Ali Albwardy, patron of the Dubai Polo Team
- Adolfo Cambiaso, 10-goal professional polo player
- Lolo Castagnola, 9-goal professional polo player

== Partnerships ==
Ham Polo Club engages in brand partnerships, sponsorship agreements and brand affiliations with companies looking to associate themselves with polo. Most recently Ham partnered with Pommery Champagne, Camden Town Brewery and Dima's Vodka. British Footwear brand Hugs & Co. have been partnered with Ham since 2016 to present as the Best Playing Pony sponsor.

== Chairmen ==
- Loftus Storey 1937–1938
- Polo ceased during World War II 1939–1945
- Loftus Storey 1947–1950
- Major S.C. Deed 1950–1954
- Edward Tauchert 1955–56
- C.J. Busby 1957–1965
- R.W.Addie 1966
- C.J. Busby 1967
- C.J.Harrison 1968–1971
- Col Gerald Critchley 1972–1979
- P.Adams/G.Godbold 1979–1984
- G.E.Godbold OBE TD 1979–1995
- N.Colquhoun-Denvers 1995–2018
- H. Davis 2018–2024
- S. N. Chamberlain 2024-2026
- The Board of Directors 2026 -

== Presidents ==
- Major Archie David 1957–1970
- Sir David Brown 1971–1979
- Doug Riley-Smith 1980
- post vacant 1981–1982
- Geoffrey Lawson 1983–1986
- Billy Walsh 1987–1992
- Bryan Morrison 1993–1996
- Douglas Brown DFC 1997–2000
- J.W.M. (Buff) Crisp 2001–2003
- Saeed Ali Albwardy 2004–2007
- Vichai Raksriaksorn 2008–2012
- Steven Lamprell 2013–2016
- Mohammed S Almarzooqi 2017–2020
- Col. Geoffrey Godbold OBE TD DL 2021-2025
- William Healy 2025-2026
- Bakhtiyar Pataudi 2026-

== Polo managers ==
- Billy Walsh 1946–1986
- Peggy Healy 1987–2000
- Tim Healy 2001
- James Lange 2002–2003
- Tom Benson 2004–2005
- David Leach 2006
- Daniel Devrient Kidd 2007
- Adolfo Casabal 2008–2011
- William Healy 2011–2021
- Gaston Devrient 2022- January–June
- Lucy Dowie/Manuel Perez (Joint Interim) 2022- June–September
- Marcus Hancock 2022 - 2023
- Antonino Menard 2024 - 2026

== Directors of Polo Operations ==
- George Meyrick 2026 -

== Trophies ==
- Annie's Trophy
- Anthony Cup Trophy
- Ascott Cup
- Asprey Red Cross Trophy
- Autumn Cup
- Aylesford Trophy
- Bannister Bowl
- BBVA Bowl
- Best of Richmond
- Boisdale Social
- Candilio Cup
- Chairman"s Trophy
- Childline Trophy
- Childline Champagne
- Committee Crystal
- Crescent Oil Trophy
- The Gerald Critchley Trophy
- David Brown Trophy
- David Healy
- Don Zoilo
- Double Bett Trophy
- Doug Brown Plate
- Dubai Desert Palm
- Dubai Desert Palm II
- FAL Energy
- Farewell Cup
- Floating Seat
- Ghana Airways Trophy
- Goal Cup
- Godbold Trophy
- Ham Cup
- Ham Mini
- Hine Cognac Trophy
- HR Owen Trophy
- Hunt Kendall
- Indian Army Trophy
- Jimmy Edwards
- J & S Franklin Trophy
- June Bamberg Trophy
- Kingfisher Trophy
- King Power Charity
- Newport Cup Trophy
- No Name Cup
- Peter Pitts Trophy
- Peter Pitts II
- Petersham Bowl
- Player of the Year Trophy
- Polo Challenge
- Quatros Amigos
- Red Cross
- Rerrieson
- Richmond Park Cup
- Roehampton Trophy
- Rosie Adams Bowl
- Siam Trophy
- Sladmore Trophy
- Social Trophy
- Social Committee
- Stagshead Trophy
- Tauchert Bowl Trophy
- Thailand Trophy
- Tiger Mountain
- Tiger Mountain 2 Trophy
- Tiger Mountain PanAm Trophy
- Tigerstream 1 Trophy
- Tigerstream II Trophy
- Tiger Tops
- Tournament Cup
- Umpire's Millennium
- Ventura Pauly Trophy
- Visitors' Trophy
- Walsh Challenge
- Anglo-German
- Lufthansa Best Player
- Orthoceras Belemnite
