= Greg Keyte =

New Zealand polo player

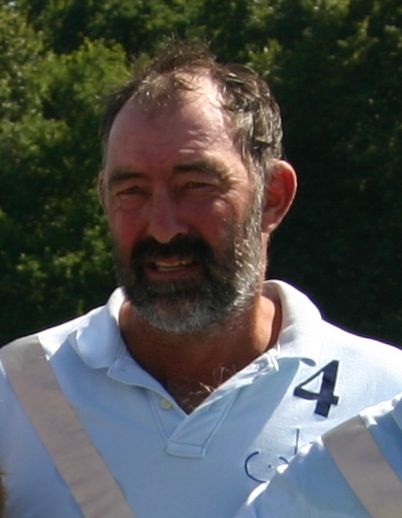
Greg Keyte at Ham Polo Club

Greg Keyte is a professional polo player from New Zealand, Keyte currently holds a 5-goal handicap though he has been rated higher in the past.

Keyte has played for the New Zealand Polo Team on several occasions including playing against Australia in 1994, 1995 and 1996.

Keyte plays the summer polo season in the UK at the Royal County of Berkshire Polo Club. He has also played in The Royal Salute Polo Gold Cup in China.
