= Leopold C. D. Jenner =

British Army officer and polo player (1869–1953)

Lieutenant-Colonel Leopold Christian Duncan Jenner CMG DSO JP (24 October 1869 – 20 October 1953) was a British Army officer and polo player. He held an 8-goal handicap at the height of his polo career. Jenner was also a key contributor to T. F. Dale's book Polo Past and Present.

== Biography ==
Jenner was born in 1869 in London, the fifth son of Sir William Jenner, 1st Baronet, physician to Queen Victoria. He was educated at Marlborough College and Royal Military College, Sandhurst.

He joined the King's Royal Rifle Corps in 1888, and was promoted to captain in 1896. Jenner served with the 60th Rifles and the 9th Lancers in the British Army.

Jenner began his polo playing career with the Army but later played for the Ranelagh club in London, winning the Novices Cup in 1896, 1897, 1899 and 1900. He also won the Ranelagh Public Schools cup in 1901 with the Old Marlburians and the Roehampton Trophy in 1903, 1907, 1908, 1909 and 1910. After retiring from the army on 4 May 1904, Jenner became the polo manager at the Ranelagh Club. In 1912 Jenner's handicap was raised to 8 goals, making him one of England's top players at the time. He also won the Army fencing championship at the Royal Military Tournament in 1895.

He rejoined the army in August 1914 after the start of the First World War. He served in Egypt and Gallipoli, and was awarded the Distinguished Service Order. He served in France from 1916 to 1918, and was made a Companion of the Order of St Michael and St George in the 1919 New Year Honours. He also received the Order of the Crown of Romania.

In 1899, he married Nora Helen Gertrude Stewart, daughter of Field Marshal Marshal Sir Donald Stewart, 1st Baronet. Following the First World War, he lived at Avebury Manor in Avebury, Wiltshire, where he served as a JP. He died in Bath in 1953.
