= 27th Lancers =

Disbanded British cavalry unit

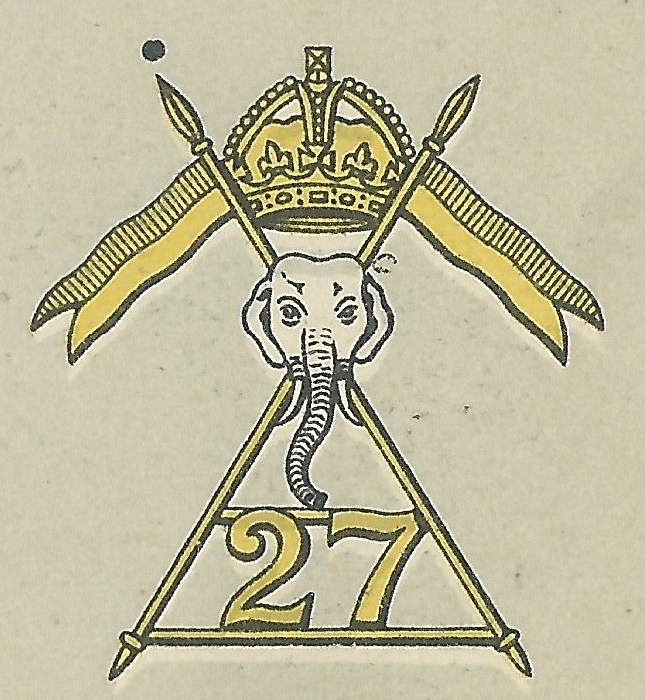
- Cap Badge of the 27th Lancers c. 1941
- Active: 1941–1945
- Country: United Kingdom
- Branch: British Army
- Type: Cavalry Regiment
- Role: Reconnaissance
- Size: 1 Regiment

The 27th Lancers was a British Army cavalry regiment from 1941 to 1945.

== History ==
The regiment was raised in June 1941 from a cadre of personnel taken from the 12th Royal Lancers. It was assigned to the 11th Armoured Division as the divisional reconnaissance regiment and was known as 'Porterforce' after its commanding officer, Lt Col Andrew Horsbrugh-Porter. It was later withdrawn and held under command of GHQ.

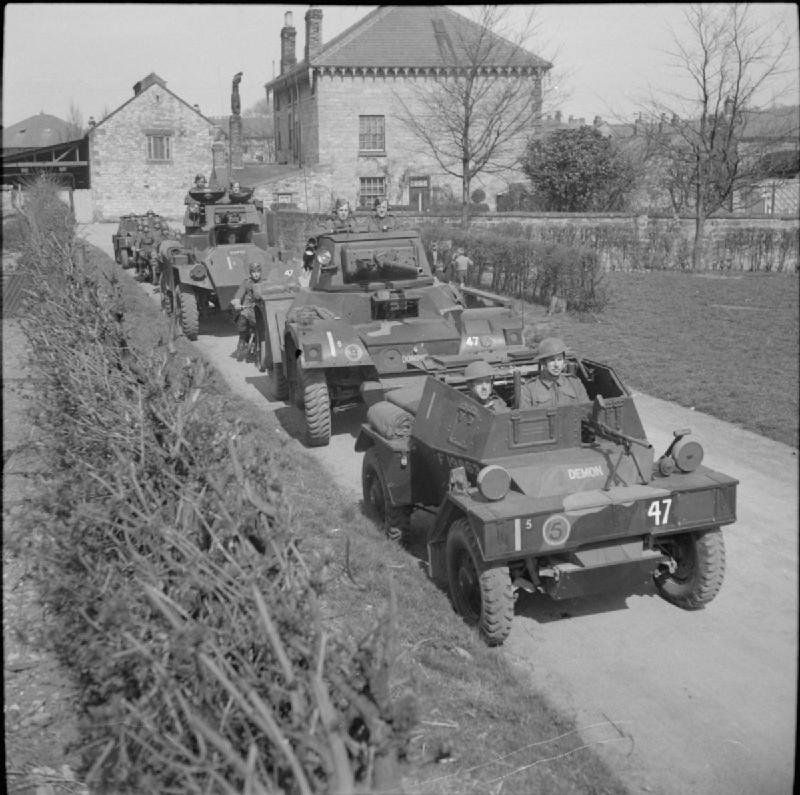
Armoured cars of the 27th Lancers, 11th Armoured Division, 19 April 1942. A scout car leads, followed by Daimler and Humber armoured cars, with more scout cars bringing up the rear.

In 1943, it was shipped to Egypt; in 1944 it moved to Italy, where it served as an independent reconnaissance regiment for the Allied Force Headquarters, and finished the war in Austria, where it was disbanded in August 1945. Some personnel were transferred to the 12th Lancers.

(In a film made in 1936 (The Charge of the Light Brigade), there was a fictional regiment called the 27th Lancers.)
