= Avebury Manor and Garden =

Grade I listed manor house in England

Avebury Manor & Garden
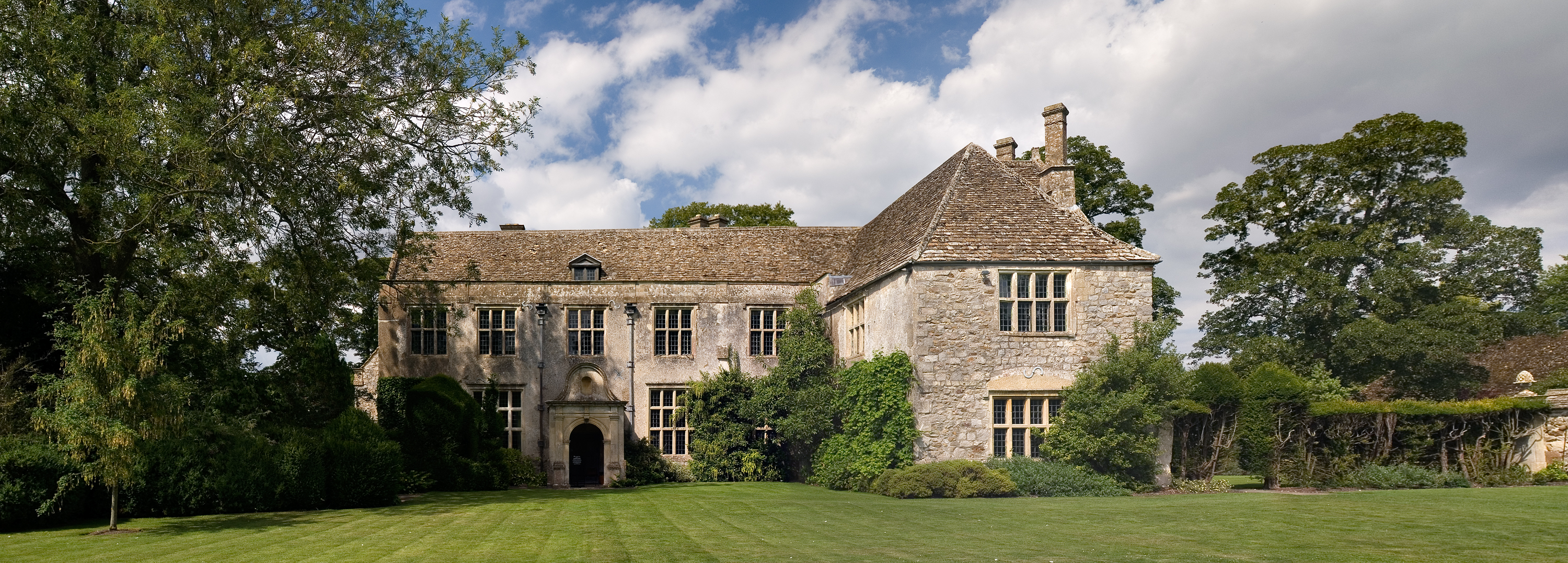
- Avebury Manor from the south
- Interactive map of the Avebury Manor & Garden area

General information
- Type: Manor house
- Classification: Grade I
- Location: Avebury, United Kingdom
- Coordinates: 51.4289°N 1.8591°W
- Opened: Early 16th century
- Owner: National Trust

Avebury Manor & Garden is a National Trust property consisting of a Grade I listed early-16th-century manor house and its surrounding garden. It is in Avebury, near Marlborough, Wiltshire, England, in the centre of the village next to St James's Church and close to the Avebury neolithic henge monument.

== History ==
The manor house was built on or near the site of Avebury Priory, a Benedictine cell or priory of the Abbey of Saint-Georges, Boscherville, Normandy, founded in 1114. Subsequently, the estate passed into the ownership of Fotheringhay College, Northamptonshire, in 1411. Fragments of the religious foundation were incorporated into the later house.

William Sharington bought and surveyed the manor in 1548, suggesting alterations to the existing building. The earliest parts of the present house were probably built after William Dunch of Little Wittenham in Berkshire (now Oxfordshire) purchased the estate in 1551. It was some distance from most of his lands which centred on Wittenham, but he appears to have purchased it because of an interest in ancient monuments such as the Avebury stone circles. Around that time, a stone dovecote was erected in the grounds. In the 1580s, Dunch passed it on to his younger son, Walter, whose daughter, Deborah, Lady Moody, grew up at the manor before emigrating to America and founding Gravesend in Brooklyn in 1645.

After Walter Dunch's death in 1594, his widow, Deborah, married Sir James Marvyn (who served as High Sheriff of Wiltshire in 1596), and the couple were responsible for a major extension or remodelling of the house around 1601, especially the south range. In 1640 the Dunch family sold it to John Stawell, and the estate was sequestered when he was accused of treason in 1646. It was sold to George Long in 1652 but restored to Stawell in 1660 on his release from the Tower of London.

=== 20th century ===
The house has had many extensions and changes over the centuries, including the addition of a racquets court in the 18th century, the final addition being the West Library which was added by the family of Leopold C. D. Jenner who occupied the house in the early 20th century and completely redesigned the gardens. The house was leased and restored by Alexander Keiller, heir to the James Keiller & Son marmalade business, who took an intense interest in Avebury henge in the late 1930s.

In 1955 the rate of destruction of country houses had reached its peak, at one house every five days. The fate of Avebury Manor was in serious doubt when Keiller, whose excavations of the henge had been ended by the outbreak of war in 1939, put it up for sale. Few at the time were interested in the national heritage and the prospects for the manor were bleak. At this point Sir Francis Knowles stepped in and purchased Avebury Manor from Keiller. The Times described Knowles as "a fundamental scientist of outstanding calibre". He set about the restoration of the house which became an absorbing love as he learnt much about its construction, and claimed to have uncovered the signs of Gothic arches in the north east corner which had been filled in during Elizabethan times. The family lived partly in cottages on the estate and partly in the house over the following three years, as the works progressed with substantial financial help from the Ministry of Works.

In May 1956, the house was amongst the first of the smaller houses to be opened to the public. In 1958 it was designated Grade I. In 1948 Knowles had married Ruth Jessie Brooke-Smith, the daughter of the Rev Arthur Brooke-Smith. They brought up a large family at the manor: one son, Charles Francis (b. 1951) who later succeeded to the baronetcy, and three daughters, as well as a stepdaughter born to Ruth and her first husband, Dickie Hulse, an RAF fighter pilot killed in action during the Second World War.

The Knowles children recall it as a magical place in which to grow up, with acres of space to roam. They helped in all aspects of the early years of rather amateurish historic house tourism: using a surplus Second World War field telephone between the tour guide (often an au pair with a vivid imagination) and the ticket office, serving teas, and helping themselves to coins from the wishing well to buy ice-creams from Sumbler's, the butchers just outside the gates. "Many would remember Francis as a most excellent host. Particularly memorable, however, was his hospitality at his beautiful Elizabethan house at Avebury, where he and his wife, Ruth, entertained so many people." Set against this background, remote from academic biology, he appeared to one of his colleagues as 'a fascinating man who would really have been more at home in the eighteenth century'. To another he gave proof that 'one could be both a distinguished scholar and a warm, vibrant person'.

By 1974 the rate of destruction of the country house had come to a near standstill. This was due not just to stricter application of legislation, but also the high-profile Destruction of the Country House exhibition held in 1974 by the Victoria and Albert Museum. Having preserved the house for future generations, Knowles died suddenly on 13 July of that year in London, at the age of 59. He is buried in the churchyard of St James, Avebury, next to the house he had restored.

In 1976, Knowles' widow sold the house to Michael Brudenell-Bruce, 8th Marquess of Ailesbury. After the Brudenell-Bruces left in 1981, it was bought in 1988 by property developer Ken King, who caused local controversy by making changes without planning permission and opening an "Elizabethan experience" visitor attraction which included a faux torture chamber in an old storeroom. After King's bankruptcy the house was bought in 1991 by the National Trust.

== Visitor attraction ==
The National Trust keep the house open to the general public. The garden was completely redesigned in the early 20th century. The topiary and other formal gardens are contained within walls and clipped box, creating numerous "rooms".

In 2011, Avebury Manor was the subject of the BBC One television series The Manor Reborn, in which the house was refurbished by a group of experts in collaboration with the National Trust. The four-part series was presented by actress Penelope Keith (the title of the series refers to her earlier television work, To the Manor Born) and former antiques dealer Paul Martin, with contributions from experts including Dan Cruickshank (on architecture).

As of 2016, visitors are encouraged to touch and experience the furnishings and objects in the rooms which now represent periods in the house from the 16th century to the early 20th century.

Avebury Manor was damaged by flooding on 5 January 2024. The manor is closed to the public whilst repairs are carried out. The National Trust are aiming to reopen the manor to visitors in time for Christmas 2025.

The house is reputedly haunted.
