= Ariel Tapia =

Ariel Tapia is a 10-goal Pato player as well as a 5-goal polo professional. Tapia has won the Abierto Argentino de Pato (pato world championships) several times as well as a number of important polo tournaments.
