= Billy Walsh (polo) =

Irish polo player

William Francis Walsh (1907–1992) was an Irish polo player. He is regarded as one of the three key figures in the post war revival of the sport of polo in the United Kingdom. He single-handedly restarted Ham Polo Club in 1946.

== Early life ==
Like so many of the pioneers of polo in the western world Billy Walsh was an Irishman, born in County Kilkenny. In the 1920s he went to the USA where he gained his initial skills and a talent that was to take him to 5-goals by 1928.

== Polo career ==
In 1933, Walsh went to work for Major Philip Magor training the many Argentine polo ponies imported by Magor to Roehampton Polo Club. Walsh became recognised throughout the polo world for his skills in making polo ponies - it has been said that his handicap could have been much higher had he spent more time playing, rather than training.

In 1936, Captain Tom Brigg, owner of the Equestrian Centre at Ham Gate and member of the Swaine Adney Brigg family, invited Walsh to run his stables and teach polo there. Three years later he joined the cavalry and, after his army service returned to Ham to find that Capt. Brigg had died and that the Equestrian Centre was for on the market. Using his gratuity, he bought the stables and revived Ham Polo Club under HPA rules.

Walsh was on the winning team with Ham Polo Club in 1947 in the first polo tournament to be played in post war England. The team took home the prestigious Roehampton Trophy.

In 1977, Walsh gave up the game. It was not until 1982 though that he gave up the position of manager of Ham Polo Club to become the president. He has been succeeded as manager by two generations. Firstly his daughter Peggy Healy and secondly his grandson Tim Healy. The Billy Walsh Tournament is still played at Ham Polo Club today, the finals are held in September.

The Hurlingham Polo Association blue book noted in tribute to Billy that it was due to his 'initiative, determination and enthusiasm that Ham Polo Club grew and flourished under his patrician eye"

In 1985, on International Day, the Queen presented Walsh with a bronze of a polo player and pony, donated by his many friends in recognition of his lifelong work.

At the 2007 Audi Polo Awards, the La Martina Lifetime Achievement Award was given to Walsh for his contribution to the sport.

== Family ==
Walsh was married to Ivy and had two children, Peggy and Brian. Their daughter Peggy married actor David Healy. They had two sons William and Tim, who are both polo players.
