= Porter baronets =

Set index for Porter baronets

There have been two baronetcies created for persons with the surname Porter, both in the Baronetage of the United Kingdom. As of 2026 one is extant.

- Porter baronets of Frimley (1889)
- Porter baronets of Merrion Square (1902): see Horsbrugh-Porter baronets
