= Horsbrugh-Porter baronets =

Baronetcy in the Baronetage of the United Kingdom

The Porter, later Horsbrugh-Porter Baronetcy, of Merrion Square in the City and County of Dublin, is a title in the Baronetage of the United Kingdom. It was created on 24 July 1902 for the Irish lawyer, judge and Liberal politician Andrew Porter. He served as Solicitor-General for Ireland from 1881 to 1882, as Attorney-General for Ireland from 1882 to 1883 and as Master of the Rolls for Ireland from 1883 to 1906. The second Baronet assumed the additional surname of Horsbrugh in 1911.

== Porter, later Horsbrugh-Porter baronets, of Merrion Square (1902) ==
- Sir Andrew Marshall Porter, 1st Baronet (1837–1919)
- Sir John Scott Horsbrugh-Porter, 2nd Baronet (1871–1953)
- Sir Andrew Marshall Horsbrugh-Porter, 3rd Baronet (1907–1986)
- Sir John Simon Horsbrugh-Porter, 4th Baronet (1938–2013)
- Sir (Andrew) Alexander Marshall Horsbrugh-Porter, 5th Baronet (born 1971)

The heir apparent is the present holder's only son William John Ernest Horsbrugh-Porter (born 2006).

== Arms ==
Coat of arms of Horsbrugh-Porter baronets
Notes Granted 1 September 1902 by Sir Arthur Edward Vicars, Ulster King of Arms Crest On a wreath of the colours on a fasces fesswise a cherub Proper. Escutcheon Argent on a bend Azure three bells of the field in chief a portcullis and in base two keys in saltire Sable. Motto J'ayme Porter Sacours

== See also ==
- Porter baronets

== Notes ==
Baronetage of the United Kingdom
Preceded by Hermon-Hodge baronets	Horsbrugh-Porter baronets of Merrion Square; 24 July 1902	Succeeded by Jackson baronets
