= Thomas Kingscote =

British courtier (1845–1935)

Thomas Arthur Fitzhardinge Kingscote CVO (16 January 1845 – 21 September 1935) was a British courtier.

== Family ==
Kingscote came from a family that had held the manor of Kingscote, Gloucestershire since the 11th century. He was the son of Colonel Thomas Henry Kingscote and his second wife, the Honourable Harriott Mary Anne Kingscote, daughter of Lieutenant-General Benjamin Bloomfield, 1st Baron Bloomfield of Ciamaltha, Newport, Tipperary, Ireland.

On 31 August 1872, he married the Honourable Evelyn Mary Gifford, the fourth daughter of Robert Gifford, 2nd Baron Gifford. His son, Major Edric Kingscote, succeeded him as Gentleman Usher, but the post of Gentleman of the Cellars was abolished. His other son was Maurice John Kingscote.

His half-brother, Colonel Sir Robert Kingscote, also later served in the Royal Household as Equerry to King Edward VII.

== Career ==
Kingscote became Gentleman of the Cellars and Gentleman Usher to Queen Victoria and then to Edward VII and George V. He retired in 1919 and was appointed an Extra Gentleman Usher.

Kingscote was appointed Member of the Royal Victorian Order (MVO) in 1901 and Commander of the Royal Victorian Order (CVO) in the 1920 New Year Honours.
