= Geoffrey Stanley Phipps-Hornby =

Captain Geoffrey Stanley Phipps-Hornby (15 Dec 1856 – 9 November 1927) was a British Army officer and polo player.

He was born on 15 December 1856 in Little Green, Petersfield, Hampshire, to captain (later Admiral of the Fleet Sir) Geoffrey Thomas Phipps Hornby and his wife Emily Francis (née Coles), the sister of Captain Cowper Coles. He was the elder brother of Brig.-Gen. Edmund Phipps-Hornby, VC, and Admiral Robert Stewart Phipps-Hornby.

He was educated at Eton and commissioned into the Rifle Brigade (The Prince Consort's Own) as a sub-lieutenant in 1875. He was promoted to lieutenant in 1878 and fought in the Second Anglo-Afghan War, being awarded the Afghanistan Medal with the clasp for Ali Masjid. He served in the Mahsud Waziri Expedition of 1881 as Orderly Officer to Brig.-Gen. Gordon. He was promoted to captain in 1883 and was selected to attend the Staff College, Sandhurst (now the Staff College, Camberley), in 1889, passing out in 1890, but retired from the Army in 1891. He was appointed to the 2nd Battalion, Royal Rifle Reserve Regiment, (a short-lived volunteer Rifle regiment raised during the Boer War) in 1900 and reverted to the Reserve of Officers in 1901.

In 1884, he married Jessie Wilson Gunston, daughter of Thomas Bernard Gunston, partner in a firm of merchants and ship-owners, with whom he had three children (two daughters and a son, Geoffrey Hardinge Phipps-Hornby).

On retiring from the Army, he became joint owner and manager of the Compton Stud, breeding thoroughbreds and hunters, at Sandley House, near Gillingham in Dorset. He later lived in Somerton Erleigh in Somerset and, in addition to horses, bred Guernsey cattle and Dorking chickens.

He was one of the earliest British players of the then-new game of polo, which had been introduced from India by returning Army officers in 1869–70, taking up the game in 1875 and becoming a 4-goal handicap player. He won the Hurlingham Championship Cup with Sussex in 1883, and several other County and Army trophies. He was one of those instrumental in the formation of the Blackmore Vale Polo Club and was President of the County Polo Association in 1905-6. His son, Geoffrey, was an international polo player.

He died in 1927 and is buried in the family plot in St Mary's Church, Compton, West Sussex.
