= Charles Smith-Ryland =

- Born: 24 May 1927; Barford, Warwickshire
- Died: 14 November 1989
- Occupation: Lord Lieutenant of Warwickshire

Sir Charles Mortimer Tollemache Smith-Ryland KCVO (24 May 1927 – 14 November 1989) was Lord Lieutenant of Warwickshire from 1968 to 1989.

== Career ==
The son of Captain Charles Ivor Phipson Smith-Ryland, he was educated at Eton College and married Jeryl Marcia Sarah Gurdon, daughter of Robert Brampton Gurdon and sister of the third Baron Cranworth, in 1952. He served in the Coldstream Guards from 1945 to 1948.

He was a member of Warwickshire County Council from 1949, being vice-chairman in 1963 and chairman from 1964 to 1967. Appointed a Deputy Lieutenant of Warwickshire in 1954 and High Sheriff of Warwickshire from 1967–1968, he was Lord Lieutenant of Warwickshire from 1968–1989. He was a landowner and chairman of the Royal Agricultural Society from 1976. He was also chairman of the Warwickshire and Coventry Police Authority. He lived at Sherbourne Park estate.

== Hunting ==
Smith-Ryland was an avid hunter who defended fox hunting and field sports. He was chairman of the Warwickshire Hunt. In 1970, this caused controversy because he was also president of the South and East Warwickshire branch of the RSPCA. Vera Sheppard a member of the League Against Cruel Sports led a protest against Smith-Ryland to be expelled from the RSPCA without success. Sheppard commented that the RSPCA's council was "totally hypocritical" for electing Smith-Ryland twice as president whilst ignoring the fact he was involved in the cruelty of blood sports. The national headquarters of the RSPCA responded by claiming that the Society was opposed to all forms of hunting for sport but accepted fox hunting as a method of control and it could not interfere with an appointment that did not contravene that policy.

In April 1971, the RSPCA Reform Group led by Hilda Owen staged a protest demonstration in Leamington contesting the re-election of Smith-Ryland as president. Two months later, the RSPCA Reform Group reported a victory as the South and East Warwickshire branch had voted to remove the position of president.

== Death ==
Smith-Ryland died suddenly whilst he was on holiday in Scotland, aged 62.

Honorary titles
Preceded by Victor William Oubridge	High Sheriff of Warwickshire; 1967–1968	Succeeded by Frederick Devereux Muntz
Preceded by The Lord Willoughby de Broke	Lord Lieutenant of Warwickshire; 1968–1989	Succeeded by The Viscount Daventry
