= Alec Harper =

British polo player and soldier (1910–2003)

Lieutenant-Colonel Alexander Forrest Harper DSO (12 July 1910 – 11 March 2003) fought with the Chindits, played Polo for England and was honorary secretary of the Hurlingham Polo Association.

== Early life ==
Alexander Forrest Harper, always known to his family as Alec, was born in Freshford in Somerset and educated at Blundell's School in Tiverton and then at the Royal Military College, Sandhurst.

== Military career ==
Harper was commissioned onto the Unattached List for Indian Army on 28 August 1930, arrived in India on 29 September 1930 and was attached to the 2nd Battalion, Lancashire Fusiliers on 25 October 1930. After one year he was posted to his permanent Indian Army unit and joined the 9th Royal Deccan Horse on 26 October 1931. Stationed at Poona. Harper learned to hunt big game and was promoted from zero handicap to a two-goal player by the end of his first regimental polo tournament.

In 1936 Harper attended the Equitation School at Saugor, after which he was appointed quartermaster of his regiment until October 1938, when he was appointed commandant of the Governor's Bodyguard to the Governor of Bengal. He retained this position until 1940, after which he returned to his regiment.

After the outbreak of World War II, keen to see action, he volunteered for the 2nd Chindit expedition, which was to drop long range penetration groups into Burma. The objective was to cut the lines of communication serving the Japanese Army operating against the American-led Chinese forces advancing from the north through the Hukawng Valley.

Harper took command of the 3rd/9th Gurkha Rifles after their CO became seriously ill and he led a three-day trek north-west through the Gangaw Range to rejoin Brigadier Mike Calvert's 77th Brigade south of Hopin.

At the end of the Burma campaign, Harper accompanied the 3rd/9th to Java as part of the 5th Indian Division where Indonesian nationalists had proclaimed independence from Dutch rule, and the withdrawal of the Japanese to their barracks had created a breakdown of law and order. Harper led his battalion in an advance through Surabaya in East Java, which took two weeks of fighting to restore order and free the Europeans who were being held in internment camps or as hostages. He was awarded an immediate DSO.

After attending Staff College at Quetta in 1947 Harper retired from the Army and after a period in India helping to run his father-in-law's distillery business in Calcutta, he returned to England and settled on the Cowdray Estate in 1955.

== Polo and later life ==
During his playing years Harper represented England, when it inflicted a rare defeat on Argentina in a 23-goal match in 1951, and again in 1953. Harper also played for a number of other teams, including The Mariners, which included Prince Philip, and for which he had to be made an honorary naval officer. He appeared in the British Open final eight times, mainly for his club, Cowdray Park, and finally gave up at aged 77 after playing 20 chukkas during his final season.

Between 1971 and 1989 Harper was a key figure in the sport, as honorary secretary of its governing body, the Hurlingham Polo Association.

Harper had a long-held theory that in order to play really well, sex was essential before a match.

Harper made his living by buying young horses and turning them into polo ponies. He was assisted by his Indian orderly, Bachan Singh, who had also been the regimental rough rider in the Deccan Horse. Harper also became a steward with the Greyhound Racing Association.

== Publications ==
Harper wrote two volumes of autobiography:

- Horse and Foot (1995)
- More Horse and Foot (2002)

== Sources ==
- Extracted from the obituary of Lieutenant-Colonel Alec Harper, The Daily Telegraph, 15 March 2003
- London Gazette
- Indian Army List (various dates)
