= Charles Darley Miller =

British polo player

Olympic medal record

Men's Polo
Gold medal – first place	1908 London	Team competition

Charles Darley Miller (23 October 1868 – 22 December 1951) was a British polo player who competed in the 1908 Summer Olympics as a member of the British polo team Roehampton, which won the gold medal.

== Biography ==
Miller was educated at Marlborough and Trinity College, Cambridge. He was an indigo planter in Bihar from 1890 to 1902. He started the Roehampton Club in 1903, managing it until 1939. He played polo for England against America in 1902, and for Rugby (where he was a trainer) from 1902 to 1914. In World War I, he served in the army.
