= Andrew Horsbrugh-Porter =

British peer and polo player

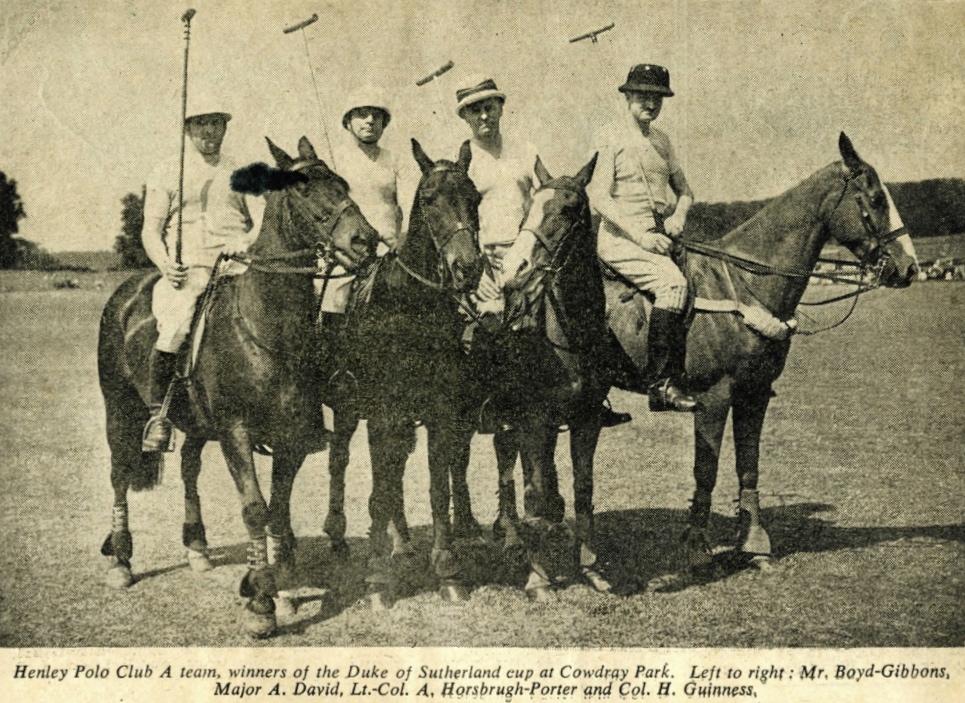
Horsbrugh-Porter with the Henley Polo Club A team in 1951 after winning the Duke of Sutherland Cup at Cowdray Park

Sir Andrew Marshall Horsbrugh-Porter, 3rd Baronet, DSO (1907–1986) was a British Army officer and one of the Horsbrugh-Porter baronets. He was born in 1907 and grew up at Newbay House, Co Wexford, Ireland, the home of the Jefferies family, his maternal grandparents.

During the Second World War, he was awarded the Distinguished Service Order for gallantry whilst serving as a captain in the 12th Lancers during the Dunkirk evacuation. He commanded his squadron 'with the greatest dash and energy so he obtained much invaluable information'. Around Saint-Omer on 23 May, he and his men checked the German advance despite being wounded himself. He was awarded a bar to his DSO for command of 27th Lancers in the closing stages of the war in Italy.

Horsbrugh-Porter later achieved the rank of lieutenant-colonel and helped establish the 27th Lancers (known as 'Porterforce') and, this amalgamation of various units, were active in the liberation of Italy most notably at Ravenna.

Later, he was the hunting editor of The Field Magazine from 1958 to 1971 and The Times polo correspondent during the 1960s and 70s. He was an international polo player who held an 8 goal handicap. He was married to Annette Mary Browne-Clayton.

== Arms ==
Coat of arms of Andrew Horsbrugh-Porter
Notes Granted 1 September 1902 by Sir Arthur Edward Vicars, Ulster King of Arms Crest On a wreath of the colours on a fasces fesswise a cherub Proper. Escutcheon Argent on a bend Azure three bells of the field in chief a portcullis and in base two keys in saltire Sable. Motto J'ayme Porter Sacours

Baronetage of the United Kingdom
Preceded by Sir John Horsbrugh-Porter, 2nd Baronet	Baronet (of Merrion Square); 1953–1986	Succeeded by Sir John Horsbrugh-Porter, 4th Baronet
