= Geoffrey Hardinge Phipps-Hornby =

- Born: 4 April 1889
- Died: 23 February 1967 (aged 77)
- Education: Eton College; Royal Military College, Sandhurst
- Military career
- Allegiance: United Kingdom
- Branch: British Army
- Rank: Colonel
- Commands: 9th (Queen's Royal) Lancers; 2nd Cavalry Brigade; 1st Cavalry Division
- Conflicts: First World War: Great Retreat
- Awards: Belgian Croix de Guerre

Lt. Geoffrey Phipps-Hornby (centre), 9th (Queen's Royal) Lancers, taken early in the Great War with (left) a lieutenant of the 4th (Royal Irish) Dragoon Guards and (right) an officer of the Army Veterinary Corps.

Colonel Geoffrey Hardinge Phipps-Hornby, CBE, (4 Apr 1889 – 23 February 1967) was a British Army officer and international polo player.

== Biography ==
He was born on 4 April 1889, the son of Captain Geoffrey Stanley Phipps-Hornby, an officer of the Rifle Brigade, and his wife Jessie (née Gunston), members of a distinguished family of landed gentry. He was the grandson of Admiral of the Fleet Sir Geoffrey Phipps Hornby, great-grandson of Admiral Sir Phipps Hornby, great-great-grandson of General John Burgoyne, nephew of General Edmund Phipps-Hornby, VC, and Admiral Robert Phipps Hornby, and great-nephew of Captain Cowper Coles, designer of the ill-fated HMS Captain, and James Hornby, headmaster of Eton. Cousins on his father's side included the Rt. Rev. Hugh Leycester Hornby, the latter's son Richard Hornby, MP, and the Earls of Derby and other members of the Stanley family. On his mother's side, he was a cousin of Sir Derrick Gunston.

Geoffrey Phipps-Hornby (left) winning the Jorrocks Cup at the Rifle Brigade Point-to-Point Races held at Chawton, near Alton, Hampshire, in 1909.

He grew up at Sandley Hall, near Gillingham in Dorset, where his father, after retiring from the Army, was joint owner and manager of the Compton Stud, breeding thoroughbreds and hunters. He was educated at Eton and Sandhurst and, on passing out from Sandhurst in 1909, was commissioned into the Rifle Brigade as a second lieutenant. He was promoted to lieutenant in 1911 and, in 1912, was transferred to the 9th (Queen's Royal) Lancers, with whom he spent the rest of his career. On the outbreak of the Great War, he was seconded for service on the Staff and served as ADC to Brigadier-general (later General) de Lisle, commander of 2nd Cavalry Brigade during the Great Retreat. He was promoted to captain in May 1915 and was slightly wounded by a shell splinter while on the staff of Brig.-Gen. Mullens, who had succeeded de Lisle as commander of 2nd Cavalry Brigade on the latter's promotion to the command of 1st Cavalry Division. He returned to his regiment later in 1915, and was promoted to Acting Major in 1917 and Brevet Major in 1919. He was mentioned in despatches three times (in 1915, 1916 and 1919) and was awarded the Belgian Croix de Guerre in 1918.

Lt. Phipps-Hornby (right) with Frederic Coleman (left), Ypres, May 1915.

Leaving active service for the Reserve of Officers after the war, he returned to his family who were, by that time, living in Somerton Erleigh in Somerset. A stained glass window in the north aisle of the Church of St Michael and All Angels, Somerton, was commissioned by his family in thanks for his safe return from the war that had taken so many of his relations. On 22 July 1924, he married Rosie Eileen May Daly, daughter of Major Denis St. George Daly of the 18th Hussars, with whom he had two daughters.

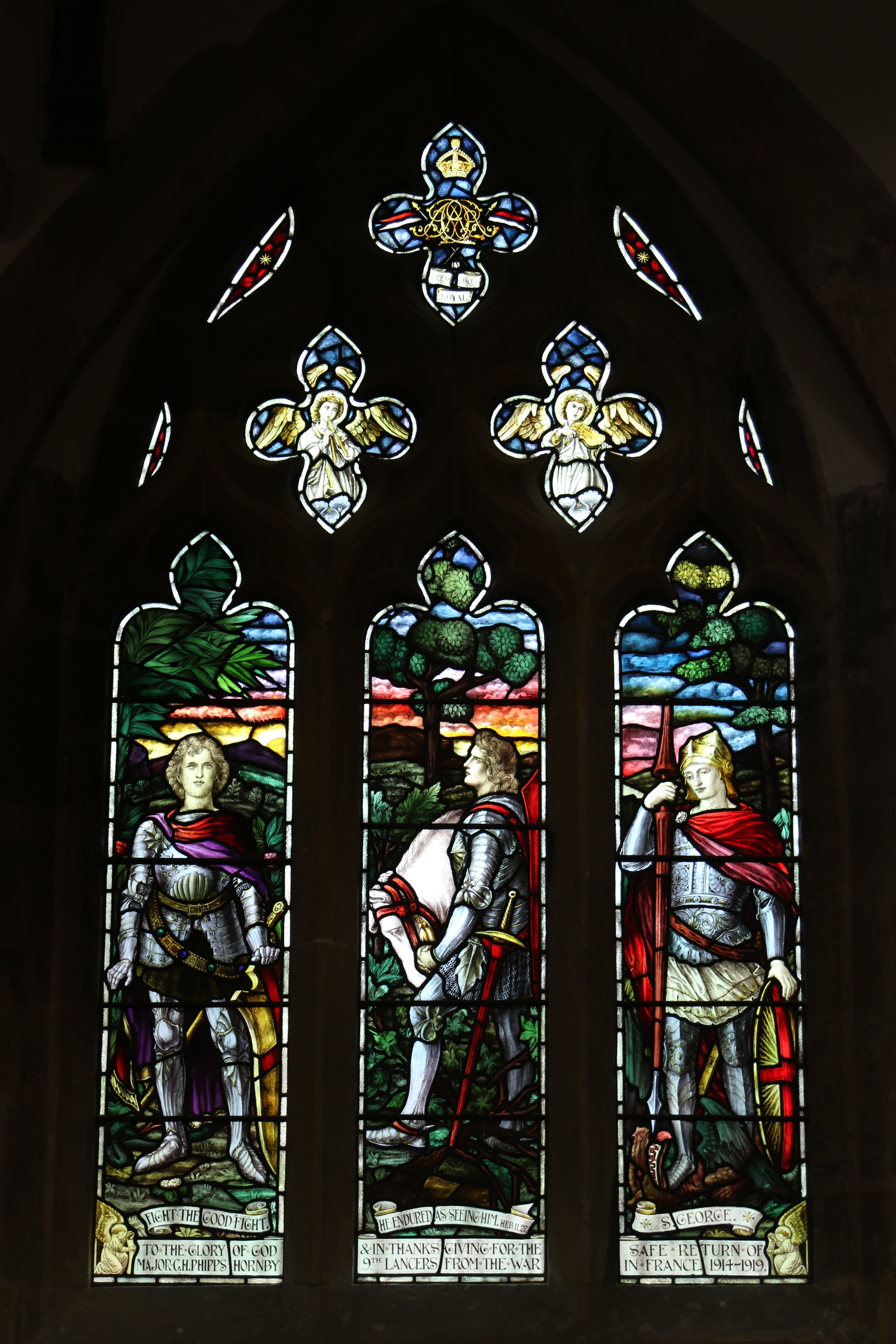
Stained glass window in the Church of St Michael and All Angels, Somerton

He was an accomplished point-to-point rider and a 7-goal handicap polo player. He won numerous polo trophies, including Ranelagh Open Challenge Cup (twice) and the Roehampton Trophy on five occasions (in 1914 with the Old Etonians, 1926 with Templeton, 1929 with the Pilgrims, 1934 with the Panthers and 1950 with Sussex). While a spectator of the 1931 final of the Ranelagh Open Challenge Cup, he replaced an injured member of one of the teams, wearing leather chaps over his flannel trousers. He was a member of the British team that was beaten by the United States of America for the Westchester Cup in 1924.

In addition to his Regular Army service, he was an officer in the North Somerset Yeomanry, the yeomanry being the mounted contingent of the Territorial Army. He resigned his commission in the TA in 1928.

In April 1939, on reaching the normal age limit for liability for recall, he was removed from the Reserve of Officers, but returned to active service on the outbreak of the Second World War, during which he was promoted to colonel. He was again mentioned in despatches in 1945 and was appointed a CBE in 1946. He spent his final years with his wife and their Pekingeses on the Phipps-Hornby family estate in Lordington, near Chichester, West Sussex, (of which much of the land had been sold) where he died in 1967.
