= Eric Horace Tyrrell-Martin =

English polo player

Eric Horace Tyrrell-Martin (30 April 1905 – 21 April 1953) was an English international polo player. At the height of his career, he held a nine-goal handicap.

== Biography ==
Tyrrel-Martin played for England in the 1936 and 1939 International Polo Cup. He also won the 1939 US Open Polo Championship with Bostwick Field team.

Born in Yorkshire, he attended Rugby and Cambridge before becoming a lieutenant in the 16/5th Lancers in 1926, resigning his commission in 1929.

In 1924 he changed his name from Horace Eric Martin to Eric Horace Tyrrell-Martin.

He was invited to represent England at the Olympic Games in Berlin in 1936, but wasn't able to accept.

He was commissioned into the RAF in October 1941, leaving as a Squadron-Leader in 1946.

He died in 1953 as a result of injuries sustained while playing polo.
