= Martín Valent =

Martín Valent

Martín Valent is a 5 Goal professional polo player as well as a competitive pato player. He played for Argentina in the 2009 Coronation Cup against England at Guards Polo Club alongside Adolfo Cambiaso, Facundo Pieres and Gustavo Usandizaga. Valent also Manages Ali Albwardy's Desert Palm Polo Club in Dubai and Dubai Polo Team in the UK.

In 2009 Valent played on the Dubai Polo Team side reaching the semi-finals of the Queen's Cup at Guards Polo Club and the finals of the Gold Cup for the British Open at Cowdray.
