= John Horswell =

English polo player and coach

John Horswell

John Horswell is an English polo player and coach. At height of his playing career, Horswell held a 6 Goal handicap and played for The England Polo Team himself. Horswell is regarded within the polo community as one of the best polo coaches in the world and travels the globe teaching at different clubs. Horswell's current handicap is 3 goals and he holds an 'A' grade HPA umpiring qualification. He is also on the HPA Committees for coaching development and Arena Polo. John Horswell is the father of Chloe and Alannah who are extremely established young thriving academic girls with impressive polo records.
