= Philip Magor =

Magor photographed at Watermoor House circa 1910-1915.

Major Philip Magor (1881–1971), was a British polo player and patron of the Panthers Polo Team as well as owner of La Estrella Ranch in Argentina. Magor and the Panthers won the Roehampton Trophy.

== Biography ==
He was born in 1881 and educated at Rugby School. His parents owned the Williamson Tea company. He played for the Ranelagh Club from 1908 till 1939, though he played in America and France as well. He served in the British Army Remount Department in World War I

He died in 1971.
