= List of polo players =

== Ten-goal players ==
- Mariano Aguerre - Argentina / USA
- Alex Ferrer - Pompano Beach
- Gerald Balding (1903–1957) - England's last 10 goal player
- Adolfo Cambiaso (born 1975) (h) - Argentina
- Bartolomé Castagnola (born 1970) - Argentina
- Ricky France-Lynch - England (fictional)
- Bautista Heguy - Argentina / England
- Tomas Hernández Gómez (born 1993) - Mexico / USA
- Carlos Gracida (1960–2014) (h) - Mexico
- Ignacio Heguy - Argentina
- Marcos Heguy - Argentina
- Lewis Lawrence Lacey (1887–1966)
- Pablo Mac Donough - Argentina / Spain / USA
- Agustin Merlos - Argentina / Spain / USA
- Lucas Monteverde - Argentina
- Juan Martin Nero - Argentina / Spain
- Miguel Novillo Astrada - Argentina
- Facundo Pieres - Argentina / USA
- Gonzalo Pieres (h) - Argentina / France
- Aidan Roark (1905–1984) - Ireland
- Nic Roldan - Argentina/USA
- Gen Joginder Singh - Patiala tiger team
- Col. Jaswant Singh - Patiala tiger team, India
- Louis Ezekiel Stoddard (1881–1951) - United States
- John Arthur Edward Traill (1882–1958)
- Charles Buckingham - Australia / England

== Best known outside of polo ==
- Dennis Coleridge Boles
- Stewart Copeland
- Winston Churchill
- Joaquin Miguel Elizalde
- Heino Ferch
- Nacho Figueras
- Martin Garrick
- Flash Gordon (fictional)
- Douglas Haig
- Sue Sally Hale
- Tommy Lee Jones
- Lyndon Lea
- Carlos Menditeguy
- George Patton
- Harry Payne Whitney
- Mike Rutherford
- Walt Disney
- Enrique J. Zobel
- Juice Newton
- Claude-Alix Bertrand

=== Aristocracy, Heirs ===
- George Spencer-Churchill, Marquess of Blandford
- Alexis Mdivani

=== Royalty ===
British royal family

- Louis Mountbatten
- Charles III
- Prince Philip, Duke of Edinburgh
- William, Prince of Wales
- Prince Harry, Duke of Sussex

Bruneian royal family

- Hassanal Bolkiah
- Prince Abdul Mateen of Brunei
- Prince Bahar of Brunei
- Prince Abdul Qawi of Brunei
- Prince Jefri Bolkiah
- Princess Azemah Ni'matul Bolkiah

Malaysian royal family

- Ibrahim Ismail, Sultan (King) of Johore
- Tunku Ismail Idris, Crown Prince of Johore
- Tunku Idris Iskandar, Temenggong of Johore
