= Josh Cork =

English polo player

Personal information
- Born: Joshua Cork; 4 June 1996 (age 29)

Sport
- Sport: Polo
- Rank: 119 (3 Goal Handicap)
- Team: Dubai Polo Team, England Polo Team

Josh Cork (born 4 June 1996) is an English professional polo player.

== Professional career ==
=== 2018 Maserati Royal Charity Polo Match ===
In 2018 Cork took part in the 2018 Maserati Royal Charity Polo Trophy Match. playing alongside the Duke Of Cambridge, English international player Malcolm Borwick as well as teammate Bruce Merivale-Austinand for Team Maserati. The match was in support of the Royal Marsden Cancer Charity who the Duke is Patron for. Cork and Team Maserati drove a powerful Victory with a final score of 6 – 5 ½

=== Royal Windsor Cup 2018 ===
Cork played in the La Dolfina/Valiente final team for Guards Polo Club 's The OUT-SOURCING (The Royal Windsor Cup 2018)

Josh Cork and his teammate Kian Hall, Poroto Cambiaso and Adolfo Cambiaso won the cup, for which the price was given by Queen Elizabeth II also in the presence of the Duke of Edinburgh, it was the first time a polo match commentary has been translated into sign language on the big screen and live stream

=== 2017 Sotogrande Gold Cup Semi Final, The Queen Mother Centenary Cup Final ===
Cork was a part of the 2017 Gold Cup final Dubai Polo Team, who made their way into the semi-finals.

=== 2015 Jaeger-LeCoultre Gold Cup for the British Open ===
Cork took part in 4 matches during the 2015 Jaeger-LeCoultre Gold Cup event playing for Dubai Polo Team enjoying 4 matches and 4 victories alongside the world's leading player Adolfo Cambiaso. Cork also took part in the match for Dubai against King Power winning the match...

== Achievements ==
- Won MVP at The 2013 Royal Berkshire Festival
- The 2014 Final of The Bucketmaster Trophy (Junior HPA)
- Won The 2015 Gerald Balding 8 Goal with La Rosada
- Won The 2015 Duke of Sutherland 18 goal with Ferne Park.
