= Hipwood =

Hipwood is a surname. Notable people with the surname include:

- Eric Hipwood (born 1997), Australian rules footballer
- Howard Hipwood (1950–2023), English polo player
- James Hipwood (1842–1926), Australian politician
- Julian Hipwood (born 1946), British polo player and coach

== See also ==
- Hopwood (surname)
