= Olimpia Award =

Annual sports awards

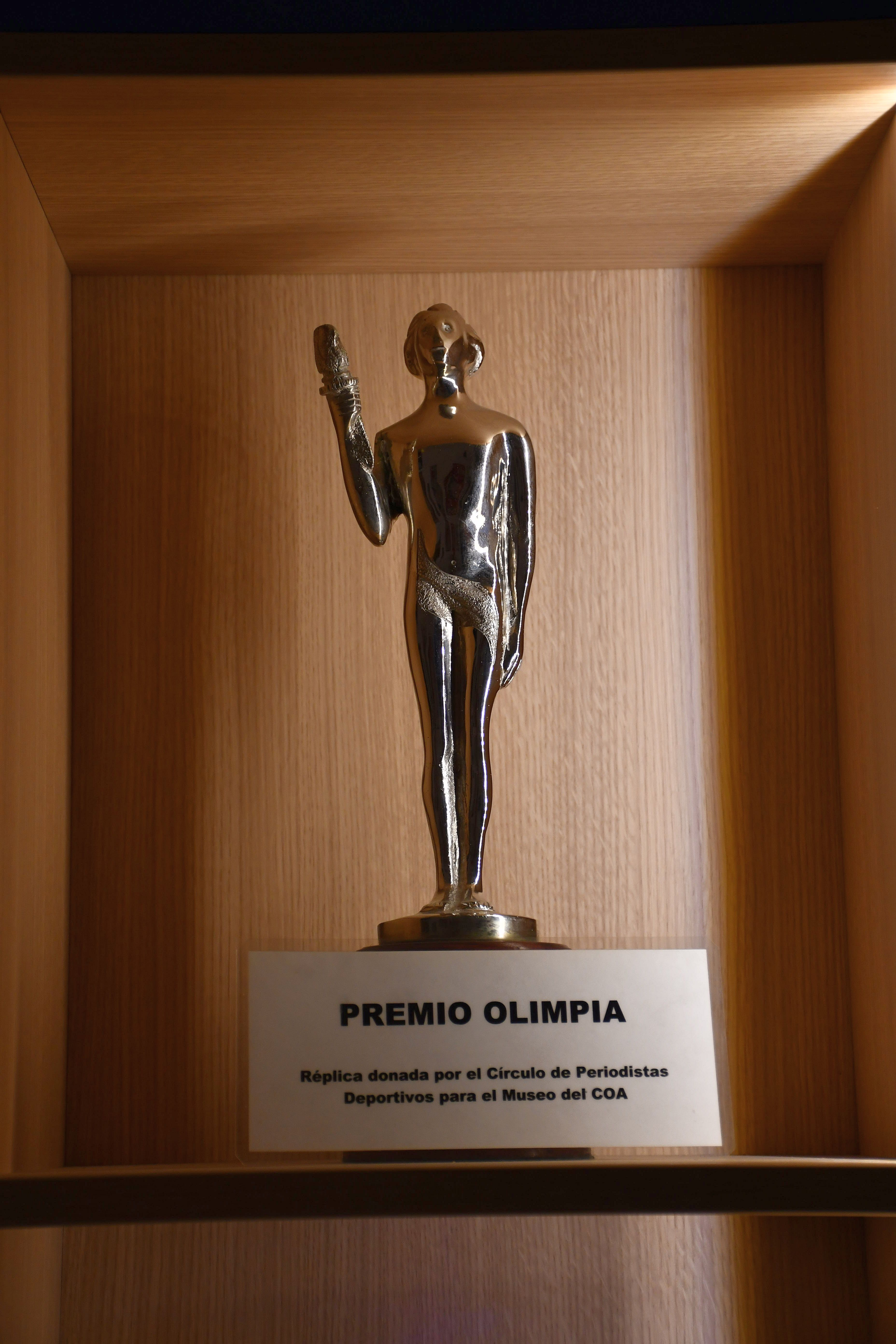
- Statue of the "Olimpia de Oro", designed by Mario Chiérico
- Awarded for: Excellence in sports
- Date: December
- Location: Buenos Aires
- Country: Argentina
- Presented by: Association of Sports Journalists of Argentina
- First award: 1954; 72 years ago
- Website: cpd.com.ar/olimpia

The Olimpia Awards (Spanish: Premios Olimpia) are Argentine sports awards given annually by the Círculo de Periodistas Deportivos (Association of Sports Journalists) since 1954. An Olimpia de Plata (Silver Olimpia) is awarded to the outstanding performer in 41 sports.

Among the Olimpia de Plata winners an Olimpia de Oro (Golden Olimpia) is awarded to the most important sportsperson of the year. Each trophy consists of a statue designed by sculptor Mario Chiérico. Football legend Lionel Messi is the all-time record winner with four awards to his name.

== History ==
The first Olimpia de Oro was given to the racing car driver Juan Manuel Fangio on 3 December 1954 at the Luna Park stadium in Buenos Aires, and the first woman to receive the award was the tennis player Norma Baylon in 1962. Other women to win the Olimpia de Oro individually were the tennis player Gabriela Sabatini in 1987 and 1988, the roller skaters Nora Vega in 1995 and Andrea Noemí González in 1998, the field hockey players Cecilia Rognoni in 2002 and Luciana Aymar in 2010, the judoka Paula Pareto in 2015 and the swimmer Delfina Pignatiello in 2017. The women's national field hockey team, known in Argentina as Las Leonas, won the award collectively in 2000, becoming the only team so honored to date.

Lionel Messi is the only person to receive 4. Lionel Messi and the boxer Santos Laciarto receive 3 consecutive Olimpias de Oro, in 1982, 1983 and 1984, due to his conquering and retaining of the world flyweight title. The tennis player Guillermo Vilas also received 3 Olimpias de Oro, in 1974, 1975 and 1977 and Lionel Messi in 2011, 2021 and 2022. The only other people with consecutive Olimpias de Oro are Gabriela Sabatini and the basketball player Manu Ginóbili, who won the award by himself in 2003 and shared it in 2004. Six others have received 2 Olimpias de Oro: the golfer Roberto De Vicenzo in 1967 and 1970, the rower Alberto Demiddi in 1969 and 1971, Diego Maradona in 1979 and 1986, Cecilia Rognoni and Luciana Aymar as a member of Las Leonas in 2000 and separately in 2002 and 2010 and the tennis player Juan Martín del Potro in 2009 and 2016.

The Olimpia de Oro has only been shared twice in its history: in 2004, when Manu Ginóbili shared the honor with association football player Carlos Tevez and in 2008, when the award was bestowed on cyclists Juan Curuchet and Walter Pérez. The only Olimpia de Platino (Platinum Olimpia) was awarded at the end of the 20th century to Maradona as "the best sportsperson of the century".

== Olimpia de Plata categories ==
The Olimpia de Plata is awarded to the outstanding performer in each of the following sports:

- Association football
- Athletics
- Auto racing
- Basketball
- Basque pelota
- Bocce
- Boxing
- Canoeing
- Cestoball
- Chess
- Cue sports
- Cycling
- Equestrianism
- Fencing
- Field hockey
- Futsal
- Golf
- Gymnastics
- Handball
- Horse racing
- Judo
- Motorcycling
- Padel tennis
- Paralympic sports
- Pato
- Polo
- Roller hockey
- Rowing
- Rugby union
- Shooting
- Skating
- Skiing
- Softball
- Squash
- Swimming
- Table tennis
- Taekwondo
- Tennis
- Volleyball
- Weightlifting
- Wrestling
- Yachting

== Olimpia de Oro winners ==
The following is a list of winners since the Olimpia was first awarded in 1954:

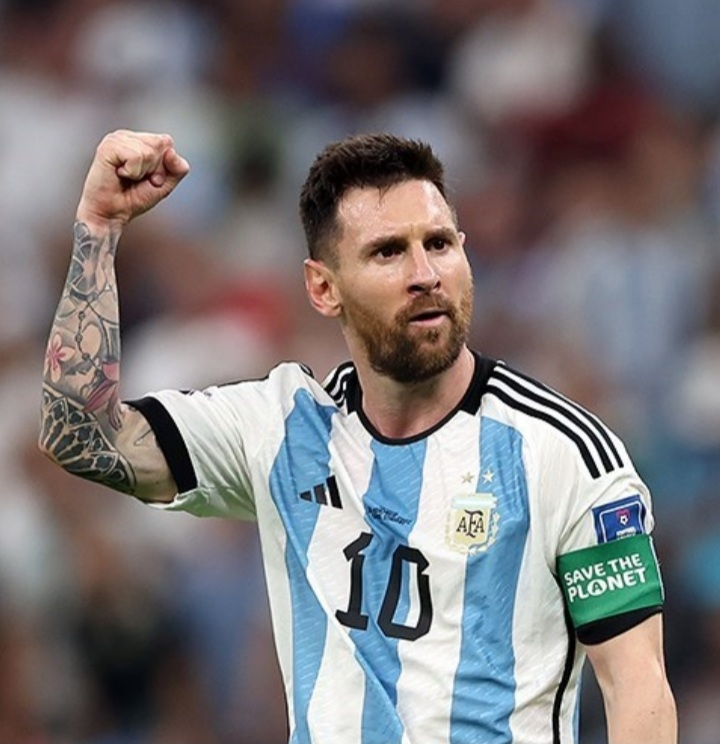
Lionel Messi has won the award a record 4 times, the most in history

Year	Winner	Sport	Note
1954	Juan Manuel Fangio	Auto racing (Formula One)	Won the Formula One World Championship for the second time.
1955	Pascual Pérez	Boxing	Successfully defended World Flyweight title two times in 1955.
1956	Jorge Bátiz	Cycling	Won silver medal at the UCI Track Cycling World Championships.
1957	Pedro Dellacha	Association football	He was captain of the Argentina national team that won the 1957 Copa América.
1958	Osvaldo Suárez	Athletics (long distances)	Won three gold medals at the South American Championships in Athletics.
1959	Luis Federico Thompson	Boxing	Won the Welterweight Argentine title and defeated world champion Don Jordan by K.O. for a non-title fight.
1960	Rodolfo Hossinger	Gliding	Won the World Gliding Championships.
1961	Luis Nicolao	Swimming	
1962	Norma Baylon	Tennis	Won the Abierto de la República and reached the seventh in the world ranking.
1963	Juan Carlos Dyrzka	Athletics (400 metres)	Won the gold medal at the Pan American Games and at the South American Championships in Athletics.
1964	Carlos Moratorio	Equestrianism (eventing)	Won the silver medal at the 1964 Summer Olympics, the only medal won by Argentina during those games.
1965	Bernardo Otaño	Rugby union	Captained Argentina during their first African tour and the landmark win of 11–6 against the Junior Springboks.
1966	Horacio Accavallo	Boxing	Won vacant WBA & WBC World Flyweight title. Successfully defended the title 2 times in 1966.
1967	Roberto De Vicenzo (1)	Golf	Won the British Open, becoming the first Argentine to win a major championship.
1968	Nicolino Locche	Boxing	Won WBA Light Welterweight title.
1969	Alberto Demiddi (1)	Rowing	Won the single scull event at the European Rowing Championships.
1970	Roberto De Vicenzo (2)	Golf	Won the Argentine Open, Argentine Masters, Ranelagh Open, Old Smuggler Grand Prix; won the Bob Jones Award and the World Cup (individual).
1971	Alberto Demiddi (2)	Rowing	Won the Diamond Challenge Sculls at the Henley Royal Regatta, the single scull event at the European Rowing Championships and at the Pan American Games.
1972	Carlos Monzón	Boxing	Successfully defended his WBA, WBC & The Ring Middleweight titles four times in 1972.
1973	Horacio Iglesias	Swimming	Won his fifth world title in professional marathon swimming.
1974	Guillermo Vilas (1)	Tennis	Led the Grand Prix Circuit and won 7 Association of Tennis Professionals tournaments, including the year end Masters Grand Prix.
1975	Guillermo Vilas (2)	Tennis	Led the Grand Prix Circuit, won 5 Association of Tennis Professionals tournaments and reached the final of the French Open.
1976	Juan Carlos Harriott	Polo	Won the Argentine Polo Open Championship for the 17th time, after winning the Triple Crown of Polo in 1972, 1974 and 1975.
1977	Guillermo Vilas (3)	Tennis	Won the French Open, US Open and 14 more Association of Tennis Professionals tournaments.
1978	Daniel Martinazzo	Roller hockey (Quad)	Led Argentina on its way to win the Roller Hockey World Cup.
1979	Diego Maradona (1)	Association football	Captained the Argentina national under-20 football team on its way to win the FIFA World Youth Championship. Named best player of the tournament, South American Footballer of the Year and Footballer of the Year of Argentina.
1980	Sergio Victor Palma	Boxing	Won WBA Super Bantamweight Title and successfully defended it one time in 1980.
1981	Marcelo Alexandre	Cycling	Won gold at the Juniors Track World Championships.
1982	Santos Laciar (1)	Boxing	Won WBA Flyweight Title and successfully defended the title two times in 1982.
1983	Santos Laciar (2)	Boxing	Successfully defended his WBA Flyweight Title three times in 1983.
1984	Santos Laciar (3)	Boxing	Successfully defended his WBA Flyweight Title three times in 1984.
1985	Hugo Porta	Rugby union	Captained the Argentine team that defeated France for the first time ever and tied with New Zealand. Named Best rugby union player of the world by Midi Olympique.
1986	Diego Maradona (2)	Association football	Captained Argentina to win the FIFA World Cup, named best player of the tournament, scored the "Goal of the Century", named Footballer of the Year of Argentina, Onze d'Or, United Press International Athlete of the Year Award and World Soccer Awards Player of the Year.
1987	Gabriela Sabatini (1)	Tennis	Won the Pan Pacific Open, the Brighton International and the Buenos Aires Tournament. Reached the final of the WTA Tour Championships and the Women's Doubles tournament at the French Open.
1988	Gabriela Sabatini (2)	Tennis	Won the WTA Tour Championships, the silver medal at the Summer Olympics, reached the final of the US Open, won the Italian Open, the Boca Raton Tournament, the Canadian Open and the Women's Doubles tournament at the Wimbledon Championships. Was the flag bearer for Argentina at the 1988 Summer Olympics.
1989	Eduardo Romero	Golf	Won the Trophée Lancôme of the European Tour, the Argentine Open and Los Lagartos Grand Prix.
1990	Pedro Ruben Decima	Boxing	Won WBC Super bantamweight Champion Title.
1991	Oscar Ruggeri	Association football	Captained Argentina to win their first Copa America since 1959. Named South American Footballer of the Year and Footballer of the Year of Argentina.
1992	Diego Degano	Swimming	Won the Santa Fe-Coronda Marathon for the third time.
1993	Marcelo Milanesio	Basketball	Won the South American Club Championship with Atenas, and the bronze medal at the Tournament of the Americas and silver medal at the South American Basketball Championship with Argentina.
1994	Julio César Vásquez	Boxing	Defended the WBA Welterweight Title six times during 1994, including against previously undefeated Winky Wright.
1995	Nora Vega	Roller skating	Won two gold medals, a silver and a bronze medal at the 1995 Pan American Games, held in Mar del Plata. Vega was the last torch bearer and lit the Pan American Cauldron during the opening ceremony.
1996	Carlos Espínola	Windsurfing	Won silver medal at the 1996 Summer Olympics.
1997	José Meolans	Swimming	
1998	Andrea Noemí González	Roller skating	Won 14 gold medals at the South American Games.
1999	Gonzalo Quesada	Rugby union	Top points scorer at the 1999 Rugby World Cup and part of the team that reached the quarter-finals of a Rugby World Cup for the first time ever.
2000	Las Leonas	Field hockey	Won silver medal at the Summer Olympics becoming the first women's team in any sport to win an Olympic medal for Argentina.
2001	José Cóceres	Golf	Switched to PGA Tour, won the WorldCom Classic - The Heritage of Golf and the National Car Rental Golf Classic Disney becoming the first Argentine to win on the PGA Tour since Roberto De Vicenzo in 1968.
2002	Cecilia Rognoni	Field hockey	Part of the team that won the World Cup for the first time, named FIH Player of the Year and Player of the Tournament at the Champions Trophy.
2003	Manu Ginóbili (1)	Basketball	Won the NBA championship becoming the first ever Argentine to do so.
2004	Manu Ginóbili (2)	Basketball	Both led their respective teams to win gold medals at the 2004 Summer Olympics and breaking a streak of 52 years without achieving an Olympic gold medal for any Argentine.
2004	Carlos Tevez	Association football	Both led their respective teams to win gold medals at the 2004 Summer Olympics and breaking a streak of 52 years without achieving an Olympic gold medal for any Argentine.
2005	David Nalbandian	Tennis	Won the Tennis Masters Cup defeating the two-time defending champion and World No. 1 Roger Federer, and became the first Argentine to win the year-end tournament since Guillermo Vilas in 1974.
2006	Germán Chiaraviglio	Athletics (pole vault)	Won gold at the 2006 World Junior Championships in Athletics improving the championship record by 6 cm. Won gold at the South American Games, at the Ibero-American Championships in Athletics and at the South American Championships in Athletics, and bronze at the IAAF World Cup.
2007	Ángel Cabrera	Golf	Won U.S. Open and became the first Argentine player to win the U.S. Open and the second to win a major, joining Roberto De Vicenzo.
2008	Juan Curuchet	Cycling	Won gold medal at Olympic Men's Madison, one of two gold medal for Argentina at the 2008 Summer Olympics and first ever olympic medal at cycling for any Argentine. Juan Curuchet retired after participating on six Olympic Games.
2008	Walter Pérez	Cycling	Won gold medal at Olympic Men's Madison, one of two gold medal for Argentina at the 2008 Summer Olympics and first ever olympic medal at cycling for any Argentine. Juan Curuchet retired after participating on six Olympic Games.
2009	Juan Martín del Potro (1)	Tennis	Won US Open defeating the five-time defending champion Roger Federer, and became the first Argentine male to win the title since Guillermo Vilas in 1977.
2010	Luciana Aymar	Field hockey	Won the Women's Hockey World Cup and was named player of the tournament, won Champions Trophy and was named player of the tournament, won the FIH Player of the Year Award for the 7th time.
2011	Lionel Messi (1)	Association football	Named world player of the year for the third time in a row, won FIFA Club World Cup, UEFA Champions League, UEFA Super Cup, La Liga, Spanish Supercopa. Named captain of Argentina national football team.
2012	Sergio Martínez	Boxing	WBC Middleweight Champion against Julio César Chávez Jr, named Boxer of the Year by the WBC.
2013	Marcos Maidana	Boxing	WBA Welterweight Champion against the previously unbeaten Adrien Broner.
2014	Adolfo Cambiaso	Polo	As captain of La Dolfina Polo Team won the Triple Crown of Polo (Campeonato Argentino Abierto de Polo, Campeonato Abierto de Hurlingham and Campeonato Abierto del Tortugas), which is considered the highest honor in the polo world, for second year in a row.
2015	Paula Pareto	Judo	World Champion at the 2015 World Judo Championships.
2016	Juan Martín del Potro (2)	Tennis	Won Stockholm Open, the silver medal at the 2016 Summer Olympics, helped Argentina to win Davis Cup for the first time ever, defeated then world no. 1 Novak Djokovic and no. 2 Andy Murray. Improved his ranking from 1045° (2016.02.08) to 38° (2016.10.31). Won ATP World Tour Award as Comeback Player of the Year.
2017	Delfina Pignatiello	Swimming	Won two gold and a silver medal at the 2017 FINA World Junior Swimming Championships, broke two championship records, a South American record and three national records. Won three gold, three silver and two bronze medals at the 2017 South American Youth Games.
2018	Agustín Canapino (1)	Auto racing	Won a second Turismo Carretera title.
2019	Luis Scola	Basketball	Led the team that won the gold medal at the 2019 Pan American Games and silver medal at the 2019 FIBA Basketball World Cup. Named member of the FIBA Basketball World Cup All-Tournament Team. Became all-time second most points scorer at FIBA Basketball World Cup and player with the most number of tournaments and games played in the tournament's history.
2020	Diego Schwartzman	Tennis	Reached ATP ranking's 8th position, qualified for the ATP Finals for the first time, defeated then world No.2 Rafael Nadal and world No.3 Dominic Thiem, reached his first ATP Masters 1000 final and first Grand Slam semi-final. Awarded in 2021 because of the COVID-19 pandemic.
2021	Lionel Messi (2)	Association football	Captained Argentina to win the Copa America for the first time in 28 years. Named best player, top scorer and best passer of the tournament. Received a record seventh Ballon d'Or, won Pichichi Trophy for the 8th time, won the Copa del Rey for the 7th time.
2022	Lionel Messi (3)	Association football	Captained Argentina to win the FIFA World Cup for the first time in 36 years. Won tournament's Golden Ball and Silver Boot. Became Argentina's leading scorer in the FIFA World Cup and won a record breaking 5th FIFA World Cup Player of the Match Award and 11th in total. Also won the 2022 Finalissima with Argentina and the Trophée des Champions and Ligue 1 with PSG.
2023	Lionel Messi (4) & Belén Casetta	Association football & Athletics (3000 metres steeplechase)	Messi won the Leagues Cup, Laureus World Sports Award for Sportsman of the Year, his eighth Ballon d'Or and second The Best FIFA Football Award. Casetta won the gold medal at the 2023 Pan American Games and broke the Pan American record.
2024	Emiliano Martínez & Franco Colapinto	Association football & Auto racing (Formula One)	Martínez won the 2024 Copa América, Yashin Trophy, The Best FIFA Men's Goalkeeper, IFFHS World's Best Goalkeeper, and the Copa América Golden Glove. Colapinto became the first Argentine driver to compete in Formula One since Gastón Mazzacane in 2001 and the first Argentine to score points in Formula One since Carlos Reutemann at the 1982 South African Grand Prix.
2025	Agustín Canapino (2)	Auto racing	Won the Turismo Carretera, TC2000 and TC Pick Up championships. Became the driver with the most titles in national motorsport.

== See also ==
- Argentine Footballer of the Year (Olimpia de Plata award)
