= Polo handicap =

Field sport handicapping system

A polo handicap is a system created by Henry Lloyd Herbert, the first president of the United States Polo Association, at the founding of the USPA in 1890 so teams could be more evenly matched when using players with varying abilities.

The players are rated on a scale from minus-2 to 10. Minus-2 indicates a novice player, while a player rated at 10 goals has the highest handicap possible. It is so difficult to attain a 10-goal handicap that there are fewer than two dozen in the world, and about two-thirds of all players handicapped are rated at two goals or less. Currently, most living ten-goal players are Argentine, with few exceptions.

Handicaps of five goals and above generally belong to professional players. It is not (nor has it ever been) an estimate of the number of goals a player might score in a game, but rather of the player's worth to their team. It is the overall rating of a player's horsemanship, team play, knowledge of the game, strategy, and horses. At one time, polo was the only sport in the world that considered sportsmanship when rating a player.

In matches played by "handicapped" players (as opposed to open competition, where handicaps are not considered), the handicaps of all four players are totaled. If the total handicap of a team is more than that of the team against which they are playing, the difference is added to the scoreboard. For example, if the Mounties polo team has a total handicap of six goals and the Tayto team has a handicap of four goals, Tayto would begin the match with a two-goal advantage.

A player's handicap is usually assessed by a committee at the authorizing club of his country. A professional player may be assigned an equivalent rating in countries where he competes. Though standards are similar, the ratings may be expressed differently. e.g.:

Argentina: 0 to 10

USA: C (-2), B (-1), B+ (-0.5), A (0), A+ (0.5), 1.0, 1.5, 2 to 10

England: -2 to 10.

== Ten-goal players, highest handicap achieved in outdoor polo ==
- Rodolphe Louis Agassiz (1871–1933) – USA
- Mariano Aguerre (born 1969) – Argentina / USA
- Alejandro Diaz Alberdi – Argentina
- Enrique Alberdi – Argentina
- Juan ALberdi – Argentina
- Mike Azzaro – USA
- Miguel (Miki) Novillo Astrada – Argentina
- Gerald Barnard Balding Sr. (1903–1957) – England's last 10 goal player.
- Adolfo Cambiaso (born 1975) – Argentina
- Guillermo (Sapo) Caset – Argentina
- Bartolomé Castagnola (born 1970) – Argentina
- Carlos Gracida (1960–2014) – Mexico
- Guillermo Gracida Jr. (born 1956) – Mexico
- Alfredo Harriott – Argentina (born 1945)
- Juan C. Harriott Jr. (1936–2023) – Argentina
- Alberto Pedro Heguy (born 1941)– Argentina
- Bautista Heguy – Argentina / England
- Gonzalo Heguy - Argentina
- Horacio Heguy - Argentina
- Ignacio Heguy – Argentina
- Marcos Heguy – Argentina
- Tommy Hitchcock, Jr. (1900 –1944) – USA
- Foxhall Keene (1867–1941) – USA
- Lewis Lacey (1887–1966) – Argentina
- Juan Martin Nero – Argentina
- Pablo Mac Donough (born 1982) – Argentina / Spain / USA
- Agustin Merlos – Argentina / Spain / USA
- Sebastian Merlos – Argentina
- Lucas Monteverde (born 1976) – Argentina
- Juan Martin Nero – Argentina / Spain
- Alfonso Pieres – Argentina
- Nicolas (Nico) Pieres – Argentina
- Facundo (Facu) Pieres (born 1986) – Argentina / USA
- Gonzalo Pieres Jr. (born 1982) – Argentina / France
- Gonzalo Pieres Sr. – Argentina
- Pablo (Polito) Pieres (born 1987) – Argentina
- Aidan Roark (1905–1984) – Ireland
- John Sinclair-Hill (1934–2025) – Australia
- Bob Skene (1914–1997) – Australia
- David Stirling (born 1981) – Uruguay
- Louis Ezekiel Stoddard (1881–1951) – USA
- John Arthur Edward Traill (1882–1958) – Argentina / Ireland
- Ernesto Trotz – Argentina
- Hilario Ulloa (born 1985) – Argentina
- Tommy Wayman (born 1946) – USA

== Nine-goal players, with a maximum 9-goal handicap achieved in outdoor polo ==
- Rodrigo De Andrade - Brazil
- Eduardo Novillo Astrada – Argentina
- Ignacio Novillo Astrada – Argentina
- Javier Novillo Astrada – Argentina
- Joginder Singh Baidwan (1904–1940) - India
- Francisco Bensadon - Argentina
- Juan Britos - Argentina
- Alfredo Capella Barabucci - Argentina
- Bartolome (Barto) Castagnola - Argentina
- Camilo (Jeta) Castagnola - Argentina
- Diego Cavanagh - Argentina
- Santiago Chavanne – Argentina
- Lucas Criado – Argentina
- Francisco DeNarvaez – Argentina
- Alejandro Diaz-Alberdi (born 1963) – Argentina
- Gabriel Donoso (1960–2006) – Chile
- Ignatius (Nachi) Du Plessis - South Africa
- Francisco Elizalde - Argentina
- Elbridge T. Gerry Sr. (1908-1999) - United States
- Alberto Heguy – Argentina
- Eduardo Heguy – Argentina
- Howard Hipwood - England
- Julian Hipwood - England
- Matias MacDonough – Argentina
- Juan Alberto Merlos (1945) – Argentina
- Juan I. Merlos – Argentina
- Man Singh II (1912-1970) – India
- Facundo Sola - Argentina
- Guillermo Terrera - Argentina
- Santiago (Santi) Toccalino - Argentina
- Eric Leader Pedley (1896-1986) - United States
