= Hurlingham =

Hurlingham may refer to:

== Places ==
- Hurlingham, Buenos Aires, a city in the Buenos Aires Province of Argentina
- Hurlingham Partido, a department of Buenos Aires Province, Argentina
- Hurlingham, Gauteng, a suburb of Johannesburg, South Africa
- Hurlingham, Nairobi, a suburb of Nairobi, Kenya
- Hurlingham Gardens, a suburb of Johannesburg, South Africa (located in Region B)
- Hurlingham, London, the southern part of Fulham, London, United Kingdom

== Sports ==
- The Hurlingham Club, a sports club in the southwest of London, England, world headquarters of polo
- The Hurlingham Club (Argentina), a sports and polo club in Argentina
- Hurlingham Open, a polo competition in Argentina
- Hurlingham Park, a multi-use stadium in Fulham, England
- The Hurlingham Polo Association (HPA), the governing body for polo in the United Kingdom and Ireland
- Hurlingham Club Ground, a cricket ground in Buenos Aires, Argentina
- Hurlingham Trieste
