= David Stirling (disambiguation) =

David Stirling (1915–1990), Scottish officer in the British Army and the founder and creator of the Special Air Service (SAS)

David Stirling may also refer to:

- David Stirling (footballer) (born 1962), Australian rules footballer
- David Stirling (polo player) (born 1981), Uruguayan polo player
- David Stirling (architect) (1822–1887), Canadian architect
- M. David Stirling (born 1940), American politician, lawyer and author

== See also ==
- David Sterling (born 1958), Northern Ireland civil servant
