= Polo in the United Arab Emirates =

The sport of polo is played in the United Arab Emirates (UAE).

== Overview ==
Polo is popular amongst royal and other UAE families. President Sheikh Zayed bin Sultan Al Nahyan had the Ghantoot Racing and Polo Club built in 1994; it was later under the patronage of his son Sheikh Falah Bin Zayed Al Nayan. in May 2013 Sheikha Maitha bint Mohammed bin Rashid Al Maktoum took part in the Cartier Queen's Cup in Guards Polo Club.

There are polo tournaments between the four clubs of the United Arab Emirates, and UAE teams participated in polo tournaments in the UK, Spain, and Argentina.

Polo clubs in the UAE follow the rules established by the UK Hurlingham Polo Association (HPA).

== UAE polo season ==
Polo is played in the United Arab Emirates from October to April every year; temperatures are too high to play during the summer months.

== UAE polo clubs ==
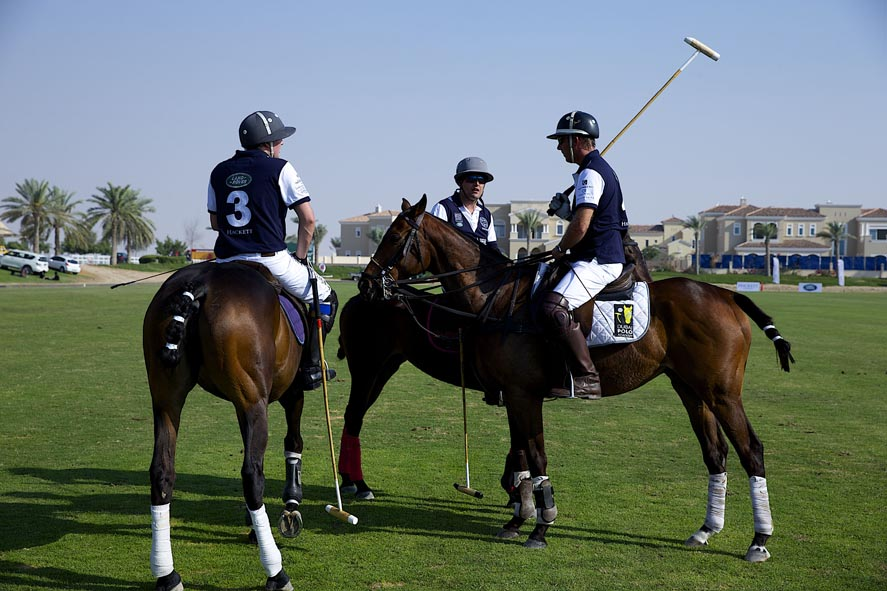
British Polo Day at the Dubai Polo & Equestrian Club

The UAE has four active polo clubs between the cities of Dubai and Abu Dhabi.

Based in Dubai since 1994, Desert Palm, owned and ran by Ali Albawardy, is twenty minutes away from downtown Dubai. It includes three polo fields and one stick & ball field. Each year, the club hosts three medium to high goal tournaments like the Cartier International Dubai Polo Challenge, the UAE Nations Cup, and the Sunset Polo International Cup as well as low goal tournaments for its polo members. Desert Palm is also home to the Dubai Polo Team, patron Ali Albawardy, the UAE Polo Team, patron Sheikha Maitha bint Mohammed bin Rashid Al Maktoum, Zedan Polo Team, patron Amr Fareed M. Zedan, Abu Dhabi Polo Team, patron Faris Al Yebhouni and Bin Drai Polo Team, patron Saeed Bin Drai, whose father established the first Polo Club in Dubai in 1974.

Dubai Polo & Equestrian Club owned and run by Emaar Properties has two polo fields and one stick & ball field. Its stables contains 150 polo ponies. The major medium goal polo tournaments host by the club are La Martina Opening Cup (8 goals) played during the month of November. The club is also home for the Dr. A Polo Team, patron Dr. Abbar, and 30 active polo members.

The Al Habtoor Polo Club opened its doors in October 2016. An equestrian haven boasting some of the best facilities in the UAE. 3 full- size polo fields, 1 stick and ball polo field and 2 full- size show jumping and dressage arenas. The club has 520 stables, 5 horse walkers and two exercise tracks. With a monumental Al Habtoor Polo Resort (previously known as The St. Regis Dubai) as the centrepiece and 146 villas surrounding the polo fields, the Al Habtoor Polo Club is truly a magnificent addition to the polo and equestrian community of Dubai. The club is situated in Dubailand, being in the heart of all equestrian activities and a mere 15 minutes from Downtown Dubai.

The club is now also the new and permanent home of the Dubai Polo Gold Cup Series, which consists of 5 tournaments, 3 High Goal and 2 Medium to Low Goal.

Saif Polo Club, owned by Ahmed Al Guhair, is a private club based in Khawaneej, Dubai. The club organized its first medium goals tournament in December 2012, the National Day Polo Cup.

Based 40 minutes from Abu Dhabi city, the Ghantoot Racing and Polo Club is a private club with eight international standard grass fields. It hosts several tournaments during the season like the Pink Polo (in support of Breast Cancer), British Polo Day Abu Dhabi and the UAE President Cup, a 15 goals tournament at the end of every season. Ghantoot has also a breeding facility for polo ponies as well as purebred Arabian horses.

== Dubai Polo Academy ==
The Dubai Polo Academy, coach Steve Thompson, runs from September to May every year and it is based at the Dubai Polo & Equestrian Club since 2005.

== Al Habtoor Polo Club ==
The Al Habtoor Polo Club is a state-of-the-art polo and equestrian community devoted to equine sports located in Dubailand. Polo Academy and Riding School cater to new riders through to experienced equestrians combining well-schooled horses and an expert team of fully qualified, professional instructors. Al Habtoor Polo Club was established in 2016.

The club also has multiple venues that are used for social and economical events, and the largest hall of which has been recently booked by CPI Trade Media to host the annual Construction Machinery Middle East Awards.
