= Mariano Aguerre =

Argentine polo player

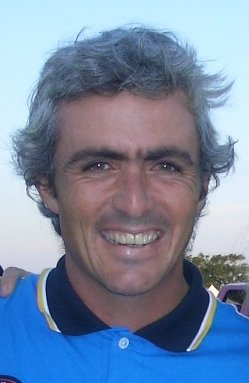

Personal information
- Born: 25 May 1969 (age 57) Buenos Aires Province
- Occupation: Polo player
- Spouse: Tatiana Pieres
- Children: 4

Sport
- Sport: Polo
- Rank: Currently 9-goal handicap, achieved 10-goal handicap in the U.S. in 1994 and in Argentina in 1998
- Team: White Birch (1987–present); Ellerstina (1992–1999 and 2012–2014); Alegria (2010–2011); La Dolfina (2005–2009); Chapa I (2001–2004); El Paraiso (2000)

Mariano Aguerre (born May 25, 1969 in Buenos Aires) is a professional polo player in Argentina and the United States. He achieved a 10-goal handicap in the United States in 1994 and in Argentina in 1998. He is currently rated at 9 goals in both countries. He is a nine-time winner of the Argentine Open at Palermo, winning with three different teams: Ellerstina, Chapa I and La Dolfina. The Museum of Polo and Hall of Fame announced that Mariano was inducted into the Hall of Fame in 2017.

== Biography ==
=== Career ===
==== U.S. ====
Like Adolfo Cambiaso, Mariano was trained by Gonzalo Pieres, Sr. His international career as a professional player began when he won the USPA Gold Cup with the White Birch Team in 1987 with Gonzalo, Alfonso Pieres and Peter Brant. According to Horace A. Laffaye's book "Polo in Argentina," Gonzalo told the author at the time, "that kid is going to be a 10-goal player." Seven more USPA Gold Cups followed, as did other important wins including the “US Triple Crown” in 2005. Mariano achieved 10-goal handicap in the U.S. in 1994.

He has won the C.V. Whitney (6 times), and the U.S. Open (2 times). In 2006 he was named “Best Mounted Player” in Palm Beach. Mariano has played with White Birch team owner Peter Brant since 1987 and the team has won more titles than any other U.S. professional polo team. In 2016 Mariano competed with White Birch in three 26-goal tournaments at the International Polo Club in Wellington, Florida and played the summer polo season at Greenwich Polo Club in Greenwich, CT where the White Birch team is based, winning the 2016 Monty Waterbury Cup, Butler Handicap and East Coast Open. It was announced that in 2017 Mariano was inducted into the Museum of Polo and Hall of Fame for his long and illustrious career in American polo.

==== Argentina ====
Mariano won the “Argentine Triple Crown” with Ellerstina in 1994 with teammates Adolfo Cambiaso, Gonzalo Pieres, Sr. and Carlos Gracida. He is a nine-time winner of the Argentine Open at Palermo, winning with three different teams: Ellerstina, Chapa I, and La Dolfina. He obtained the “Best Mounted Player Award” in the Argentine Open on three occasions: 2004, 2005 and 2007. In Argentina, in 2012-2013 he was the captain of the Ellerstina team, completing the quartet with his three brothers-in-law: Gonzalito Pieres, Facundo Pieres and Nico Pieres. Up until the year 2014, he played on Ellerstina as the Titular player. In 2015, he began serving as the team’s coach. He achieved 10-goal handicap in Argentina in 1998.

=== Horses ===
Mariano runs Los Machitos with professional polo players, Nick Manifold and Naco Taverna. Los Machitos, based in Argentina, is a breeding and training facility for high-goal polo horses. Mariano’s horse Califa is a 2016 Polo Hall of Fame Inductee. A bay gelding foaled in 1996, Califa was a durable war horse played by Mariano in many memorable contests. Gathering a number of Best Playing Pony awards along the way, Califa ultimately earned the U.S. Open’s Hartman Award for Best Playing Pony for his gritty and intense play for two chukkers under Mariano in 2004. Mariano called on Califa again for the 2005 high-goal season, helping their team take all three of the season’s 26-goal tournament victories. Califa was recognized as Horse of the Year in 2006.

=== Family ===
Mariano is the son of Martin Aguerre and Estela Martinez. Mariano is married to Tatiana Pieres, daughter of Gonzalo Pieres, Sr. He has three daughters, Sophie, Lola and Carmen, and one son, Antonio. His three brothers-in-law, Gonzalito Pieres, Facundo Pieres and Nico Pieres, are all professional polo players. Mariano has played with them on Ellerstina and now serves as coach.

== Sources ==
- Profile at World Polo Tour
- La Dolfina
- Interview with Aguerre
