= Pablo Mac Donough =

Argentine polo player

Pablo Mac Donough is a professional polo player from Argentina with a 10-goal polo handicap.

== Biography ==
Mac Donough was born in Pehuajo and began playing polo with his family at a young age.

== Career ==
His career has included wins in the Argentine Open (9), the Hurlingham Open (9), the Tortugas Open (11), the British Open (1) the Queen's Cup (2), and the C.V. Whitney Cup (1). Mac Donough has also played in Spain, winning the Sottogrande Gold (2) and Silver Cups. Won Camara de Diputados (2), Ellerstina Gold Cup 2006.

In Argentina, Mac Donough played with Ellerstina from 2003 to 2010, first alongside Matias Mac Donough and his cousins Gonzalo and Facundo Pieres, and later with Juan Martín Nero in place of his brother. In 2010 the team won the Argentine Triple Crown.

For the 2011 season, Mac Donough and Nero joined La Dolfina to play with Adolfo Cambiaso and David Stirling. The team won three consecutive Triple Crowns from 2013 to 2015, making La Dolfina the only team in polo history to achieve it. The team also won the Argentine Open eight consecutive times from 2013 to 2020.

In 2010, Mac Donough played in the United Kingdom with the Dubai Polo Team and won the Queen's Cup and the British Open.

With his brother Matias, they breed polo ponies through their cria: La Irenita, many of them are now playing in the highest level of polo.

== Family ==
Pablo is married to Mercedes Venancio. He has a son called Milo Mac Donough, a daughter called Olivia Mac Donough and the youngest son, Rafa Mac Donough.
