= Dubai Polo Team =

The Dubai Polo Team is a polo team, with bases in the UK, Spain, US, Argentina and Dubai.

The Dubai Polo Team have won the British Open for the Jaeger-LeCoultre Gold Cup and the Cartier Queen's Cup many times. The team's patron is businessman Ali Albwardy. Adolfo Cambiaso is a regular player on the team, alongside Albwardy and his sons Tariq and Rashid. Other players to have been on the team include Lolo Castanola, Lucas Monteverde, Pablo Mac Donough and Piki Diaz Alberdi and more recently Bartolome Castagnola and Jeta Castagnola.

== Wins ==
During the 2011 season Dubai reached the quarter-final stages of both the Queen's and Gold Cups.

In 2010, the Team Consisting of Rashid Albwardy, Francisco Vismara, Matias MacDonough and Adolfo Cambiaso achieved Dubai's fourth win in the Queens Cup at Guards Polo Club. They also won the Gold Cup at Cowdray in this year.

In 2009, the team reached the semi-finals of the Queens Cup and lost out in the final of the Gold Cup.

They have Had successes at 12 goal level in the Dubai Trophy at Ham Polo Club and they have been finalists in the Roehampton Trophy.

== 2012 season ==
Dubai Polo Team have confirmed that they will be entering the Queen's Cup and the Gold Cup for the British Open in 2012. The team will be:

1. Rashid Albwardy (2) 2. Alec White (2) 3. Ignacio Heguy (8) 4. Adolfo Cambiaso (10)

Dubai won the 2012 Cartier Queen's Cup against Ayalya with a score of 12–11, the final goal coming from a Cambiaso penalty in extra time in the final chukka.

== 2013 season ==
The 2013 Dubai team for the UK season consisted of: 1. Rashid Albwardy (2) 2. Nicolás Pieres (7) 3. Adolfo Cambiaso (10) 4. Alec White (3)

Dubai reached the semi finals of the Queen's Cup at Guards and the final of the Gold Cup British Open at Cowdray Park in Sussex.

The team then played their first season in Sotogrande in Spain with a line up of Luis Domecq (2), Martin Valent (5), Adolfo Cambiaso (10) and Patricio Cieza (5)
