= Horacio Iglesias =

Argentine swimmer

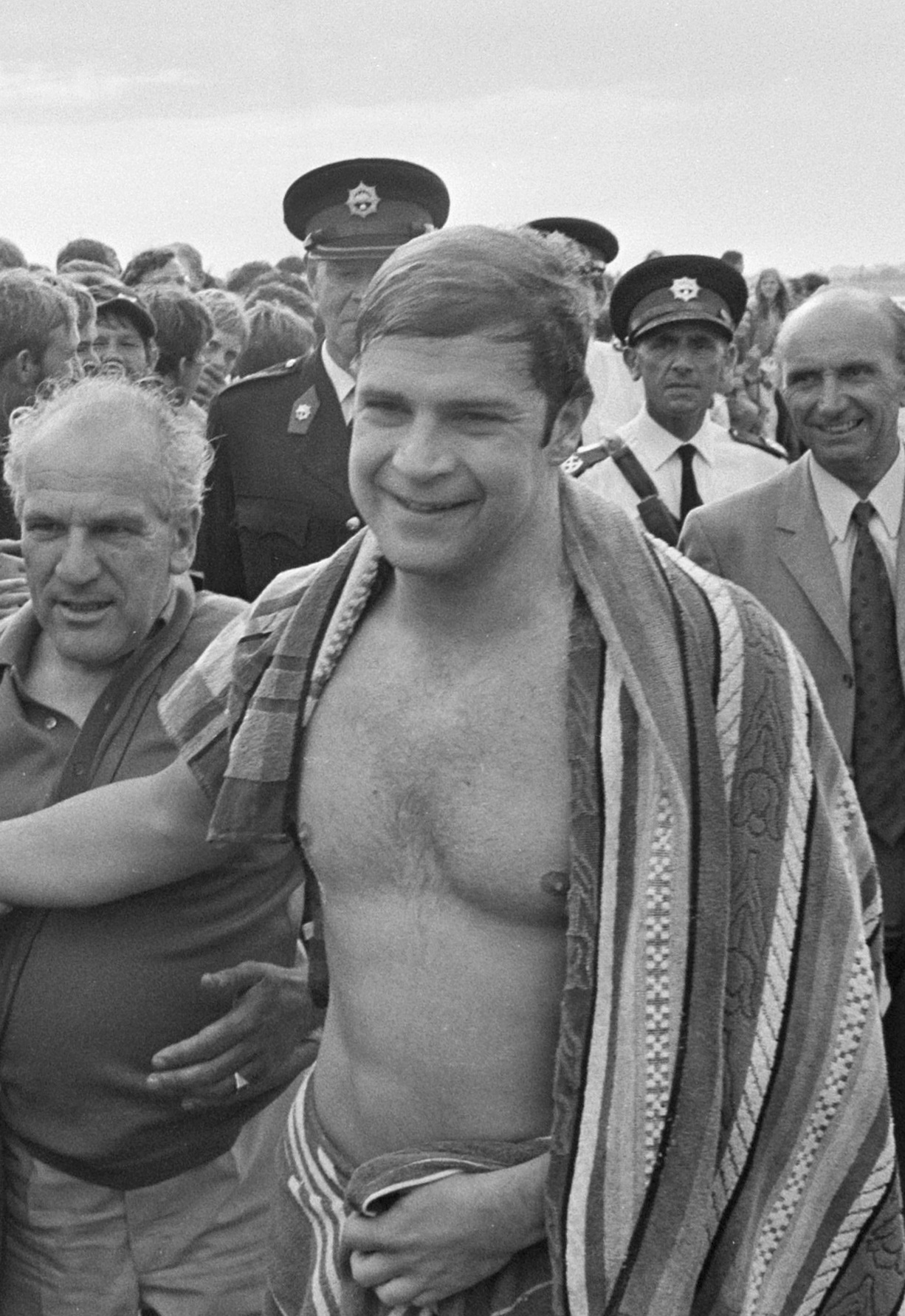
- Horacio Iglesias in 1970

Personal information
- Full name: Horacio Bernardo Guillermo Iglesias
- Nicknames: Toto, Dorado
- Nationality: Argentina
- Born: April 29, 1942 Buenos Aires, Argentina
- Died: June 25, 2004 Buenos Aires, Argentina

Sport
- Sport: Swimming
- Strokes: Free style
- Club: Gimnasia y Esgrima Buenos Aires

Achievements and titles
- World finals: World Marathon Swimming Championship 1967, 1969, 1971, 1972, 1973

Horacio Bernardo Guillermo Iglesias (April 29, 1942 – June 25, 2004) was an Argentine swimmer who won five world titles in professional marathon swimming (1967, 1969 and 1971–1973). Between 1965 and 1975 he won 28 professional races throughout South America, the United States, Canada and Italy, and was ranked first or second each year. He was inducted as an honoree in the International Swimming Hall of Fame in 2003.

Iglesias won the 24-hour La Tuque relay swim six times with three different partners, including Egypt’s Abou Heif and Holland’s Judith De Nys. He also won the 34 km (21 mile) Traversée Internationale du Lac St-Jean professional race in Canada in 8 hours and 55 minutes in 1967, in 9 hours and 31 minutes in 1968, in 9 hours and 32 minutes in 1969, in 8 hours and 39 minutes in 1971 with a second place in 1970, and excelled in the warm-water professional swims in South America. He won the 37 km (23 mile) Descente ou remontée du Saguenay in 6 hours and 3 minutes in 1967 and was fifth in 9 hours and 22 minutes in 1968.

After retiring from competition, Iglesias graduated from university in 1969 as an electromechanical engineer. After working for 22 years as an advisor, he started his own company in 1992, Axsys Comunicaciones de Argentina, a fiber-optic installation company. He was married to Albina Valle and had three sons: Luciano, Alvaro and Ramiro.

== Early life ==
To fix a minor back problem, he started swimming aged seven at Club de Gimnasia y Esgrima de Buenos Aires, one of the top clubs in Argentina. In his first major competition he swam a breaststroke leg in a medley relay. When he jumped into the water his team was leading the race, but by the time he finished, the team ended last. This failure motivated him to learn different strokes. He became national age-group champion in the 400 m, 800 m and 1500 m freestyle events and also swam butterfly at the national level. At the 1960 South American Championships in Cali, Colombia, he finished third in the 1500 m freestyle and second in the 4 × 200 m freestyle relay. He participated in local open water championships that were held in the Rio de la Plata river, winning 90% of the swims.

In 1965 he decided to quit swimming and concentrate on his university studies, but decided to compete in one more open-water championship, the 38-mile Santa Fe-Coronda Marathon. He finished first, starting a career in which he won the World Professional Marathon title more times than any other competitor.

== World Professional Marathon Champion ==
In the 1960s and 1970s there were two organizations that controlled marathon swimming, the International Long Distance Swimming Federation (ILDSF) and the World Professional Marathon Swimming Federation (WPMSF). The ILDSF was controlled by former Egyptian General Zorkani and declared the World Championship to the swimmer who won the 18-mile Capri – Naples Swim. The WPMSF’s administrative secretary, Joe Grossman, tallied swimmers’ points earned by their placing at various marathon swims during the season. A world champion was declared based upon the total number of points earned. Competitors traveled on this circuit of races and attended swims in North and South America and Europe. Horacio was declared World Professional Marathon Champion a record five times (1967, 1969, 1971, 1972, 1973) and was Vice Champion during the in-between years (1968, 1970).

During the ten years in which he swam (1965–1974) he won 28 out of 44 professional races. He was a six-time winner of the La Tuque 24-hour swim (Quebec) in which a team of two swimmers alternated swimming a circular one-mile course for 24 hours in 22 °C water. Partners included Egypt’s Abou Heif and Holland’s Judith De Nys among others. He was a four-time winner of the 25-mile Lac St Jean (Quebec) in 17 °C water.

Some of his other swims include Santa Fe-Coronda, Argentina (38 mi., water 24 °C); Hernandarias-Parana, Argentina (55 mi., 24 °C); Lago el Quilla, Argentina (10 mi., 24 °C); Mar del Plata, Argentina (23 mi., 18 °C); Chicoutimi, Canada (28 mi., 15 °C); Trois-Rivières, Canada (10 mi., 22 °C); Lac Simone, Canada (15 mi., 15 °C); Newport – Block Island, USA (25 mi., 18 °C); Marathon du Montreal, Canada (10 mi., 24 °C); Utrecht, Netherlands (14 mi., 18 °C); and Capri – Naples, Italy (18 mi., 23 °C).

== Style ==
Horacio Iglesias was noted for his stamina and persistence, and although he preferred warm water swimming, he could swim equally well in cold water: "It is like a kind of drug, this swimming. It hurts, but you don't want to stop. Maybe it is pride. If the others stay, you stay." He appeared thoughtful, smiled wanly and pointed to his head. "You will find in every marathon swimmer something wrong up here" he said.

== Awards and recognitions ==
- Olimpia Award: “Olimpia de Plata” Award (1972). In 1972 he was elected among the best swimmers in Argentina to receive the “Olimplia de Plata” Award from the Círculo de Periodistas Deportivos.
- Olimpia Award: “Olimpia de Plata” and “Olimpia de Oro” Awards (1973). In 1973 he received the “Olimpia de Plata” Award for Swimming and was then elected among the top Argentine athletes to receive the “Olimpia de Oro” Award, winning over the popular boxer and world championship candidate Carlos Monzon and becoming Athlete of the year for this recognition.
- Honoree in the International Swimming Hall of Fame (2003). He was declared an Honor Marathon Swimmer at the International Swimming Hall of Fame in Fort Lauderdale, Florida, USA in 2003.

== See also ==
- List of members of the International Swimming Hall of Fame
