= Alberdi =

Alberdi may refer to:

- Alberdi (surname)
- Alberdi Department, Santiago del Estero Province, Argentina
- Alberdi, Paraguay, a city in the Ñeembucú Department

== See also ==
- Barrio Alberdi, a neighbourhood in Rosario, Argentina
- Mount Usborne, the Spanish name is Cerro Alberdi, on the East Falkland Island
