= Hopwood =

Hopwood may refer to:

== People ==
- Hopwood (surname)

== Places ==
United Kingdom

- Hopwood Hall, near Manchester
- Hopwood, Greater Manchester
- Hopwood, Worcestershire

United States

- Hopwood, Pennsylvania

== Other uses ==
- Hopwood v. Texas, an American court case in 1996 concerning affirmative action
- Hopwood Award, a literary scholarship awarded by the University of Michigan
