= Alberdi (surname) =

Alberdi is a Spanish surname of Basque origin. Notable people with the surname include:

- Agustín Alberdi (fl. from 2003), Musical artist
- Alejandro Díaz-Alberdi (born 1963), Argentine polo player
- Cristian Alberdi (born 1980), Spanish footballer player a as central midfielder
- Cristina Alberdi (1946–2024), Spanish politician and lawyer
- Felipe Alberdi (1930–2024), Spanish cyclist
- Fernando Díaz Alberdi (born 1972), Argentine rugby union player
- Francisco José Ventoso Alberdi (born 1982), Spanish road bicycle racer
- Inés Alberdi (born 1948), Spanish sociologist, executive director of UNIFEM and younger sister of Cristina Alberdi
- Juan Bautista Alberdi (1810–1884), Argentine political theorist and diplomat
- Maite Alberdi (born 1983), Chilean flim director
- Markel Alberdi (born 1991), Spanish swimmer
- Sabino Barinaga Alberdi (1922-1988), Spanish footballer and manager
- Uxue Alberdi (born 1984), Básquet writer
