= Henry Lloyd Herbert =

First chairman of United States Polo Associating

Henry Lloyd Herbert was the first chairman of the United States Polo Association in 1890. He developed the polo handicap system in 1888.
