= Bartolomé Castagnola =

Argentine polo player

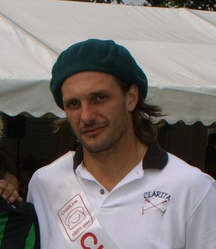
- Castagnola in 2003

Personal information
- Born: June 16, 1970 (age 55) Lomas de Zamora, Buenos Aires Province
- Spouse: Camila Cambiaso
- Children: 3

Sport
- Sport: Polo
- Club: GlobalPort

Bartolomé Castagnola (born June 16, 1970, in Lomas de Zamora, Buenos Aires Province) is an Argentine polo player who formerly held a 10-goal polo handicap and was ranked among the top twenty players. He is often referred to as Lolo.

== Biography ==
=== Career ===
Bartolomé Castagnola started playing polo seriously, when he was 14 and his father took him to the La Martina Polo School, where he got to know Adolfo Cambiaso. In 1988, he started playing polo abroad, when he went to San Diego with Marcelo Caset and won the San Diego Open. Since then, he won the Sotogrande Gold Cup, the US Open, the USPA Gold Cup, the Queen's Cup and the Hurlingham Open among other.

He participated 14 times in the Campeonato Argentino Abierto de Polo (Argentine Open), won six times and took part in the final another three times.

Castagnola played for La Martina, Ellerstina, Outback and Dubai and played in Argentina, Spain, Dubai, United Kingdom and Australia. In 2000 he co-founded the La Dolfina Polo Team, together with Adolfo Cambiaso, where he usually played on position 4. In 2011 he split with Cambiaso and founded La Natividad.

=== Marriage ===
Bartolomé is married to Camila Cambiaso, sister of Adolfo Cambiaso. They have four sons: Bartolomé Jr., Camilo, Benicio and Lola, with the two elders also professional polo players, having won the 2019 British Open Polo Championship for Dubai Polo Team.

== Sources ==
- Profile at World Polo Tour
- La Dolfina
- Interview with Castagnola
