= Facundo Pieres =

Argentine polo player

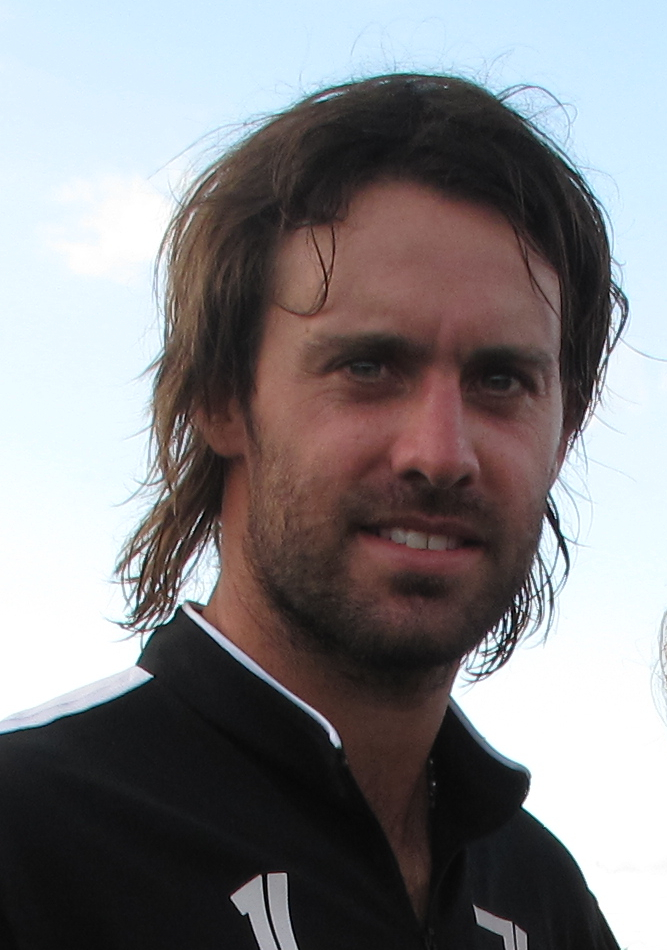
- Facundo Pieres, having just won the US Open Polo Championship 2012 with team Zacara.
- Born: May 19, 1986 (age 40); Buenos Aires, Argentina
- Occupation: Polo player
- Spouse: Agustina Wernicke (m. 2014)
- Parent(s): Gonzalo Pieres; Cecilia Pieres

Facundo Pieres (born May 19, 1986 in Buenos Aires) is a professional Argentine polo player with a 10 goal handicap. In October 2022, he was ranked number one by the World Polo Tour, but fell to number two, behind Adolfo Cambiaso, in early 2023.

== Biography ==
Facundo was born into a family of polo players and is the second son of polo legend Gonzalo Pieres and Cecilia Rodríguez Piola. His siblings are Gonzalo Pieres, Nicolas Pieres, also a professional polo player, Tatiana Pieres, and Cecilia Pieres.

His career started in 1997, when he won the Copa Potrillos with the Ellerstina Jr. team, which was a subsidiary team for the Ellerstina Club founded by his father and Australian media tycoon, Kerry Packer. Since then, he played in Argentina, the United Kingdom, and the United States. He has won the Hurlingham Open, Tortugas Open and Jockey Club Open (all in Argentina among other tournaments. In 2008, he won the Cartier Queen's Cup, though he didn't participate in the final match because of an injury, and in 2013 on the team of Zacara played with Lydon Lea, Hilario Ulloa, and Matias Gonzalez.

== Accomplishments ==
Facundo has won the most important tournaments of the World Polo Tour, the Spanish Grand Slam, Gold Cup, Sotogrande 2018 (American Team 'La Indiana') and 2017 with the Spanish team Ayala, Torneo Internacional de Polo Sotogrande.

He started playing in the Campeonato Argentino Abierto de Polo in 2003 and made it into the finals twice with Ellerstina; first in 2005 and again in 2007, though both ended in overtime losses. After losing these in extra-time only, and winning the Tortugas Open 2008. The new team of Ellerstina to 2014 is conformed by: Facundo Pieres 10, Gonzalo Pieres (h) 10, Mariano Aguerre 9 and Nicolas Pieres 9 He was promoted to handicap 10 at age 18.

In June, 2019, Pieres broke royal protocol as he was presented the winner’s trophy at the Cartier Polo Cup in Windsor Great Park, Berkshire. Pieres placed a hand on the top of the Queen’s back and again on her shoulder as Her Majesty presented him with the 'most valuable player' award.

Pieres won back to back titles of the Argentino Abierto de Polo in 2023 and 2024 with La Natividad team.
