= Lewis Lacey =

Canadian polo player

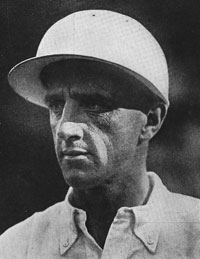
Lewis Lacey

Lewis Lawrence Lacey (February 17, 1887 – November 1966) was a Canadian polo player.

== Biography ==
Lewis Lacey was born on February 17, 1887, in Montreal, Quebec, Canada. He was the son of a professional cricketer. Born as a British citizen, he served for England in World War I before returning to Argentina to pursue his polo career.

In 1915 he won the Argentine open and become Argentina's second 10-goal polo player. In 1922 he won the United States Open Championship, he would return to play this tournament every few years. In 1924 he was asked to play for Great Britain in the Paris Olympics, he did not wish to play against Argentina so was not selected for the final team. In 1924 and 1930 Lacey captained the English team in the International Polo Cup. In the 1928 Cup of the Americas Lacey was selected to play for Argentina. Between 1915 and 1937 he won the Argentine open seven times.

He also received attention in 1928 for selling a polo pony for a record US$22,000. The shirts worn in the 1923 season by the Hurlingham Polo Club were created and sold by Lacey, the short sleeved sports shirts had a mounted polo player on the left breast similar to a contemporary style of fashionable shirts. He also wrote many essays about polo, including 'Equitation in the Game of Polo' and the 'Judge's Task in Polo Pony Shows'.

He died in 1966. He was inducted into the Museum of Polo and Hall of Fame in Lake Worth, Florida on February 12, 2010.
