= Juan C. Harriott Jr. =

Argentine polo player (1936–2023)

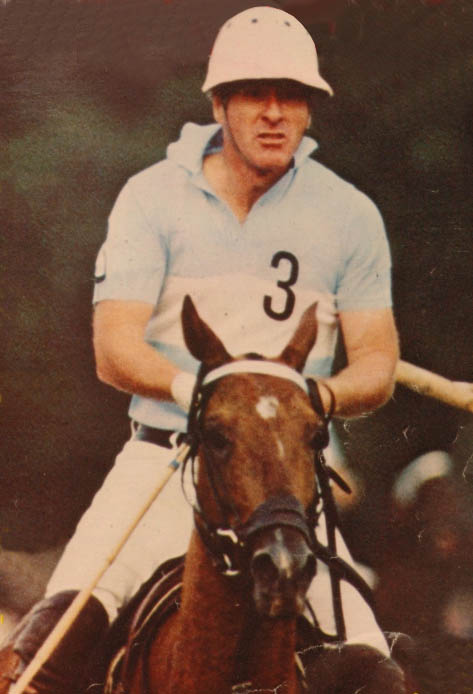
Juan Carlos Harriott Jr.

Juan Carlos Harriott Jr. (28 October 1936 – 11 September 2023) was an Argentine polo player. He was known as "Juancarlitos" to distinguish him from his father and was also given the nickname "El Inglés" (The Englishman).

== Biography ==
Juan Carlos Harriott Jr. was born on 28 October 1936.

In 1953 he obtained a polo handicap of 1, and then was soon raised to 3 in the same year. He reached a handicap of 10 goals in 1961. He stayed at a 10-goal handicap until his retirement in 1980. He held the record of having won the Argentine Open Polo Championship 20 times, the Hurlingham Open 15 times, and the Tortugas Open 7 times. He also holds the record with his team Coronel Suárez of 38 tournaments won. He won the Triple Crown four times (1972, 1974, 1975 and 1977), two of them consecutively. Representing Argentina he won in the Copa de las Américas in 1966, 1969, 1979, and 1980. He also won the Sesquicentennial Cup in 1966. In 1975 and 1976, with the Villafranca team, he won the Sotogrande Gold Cup, Spain.

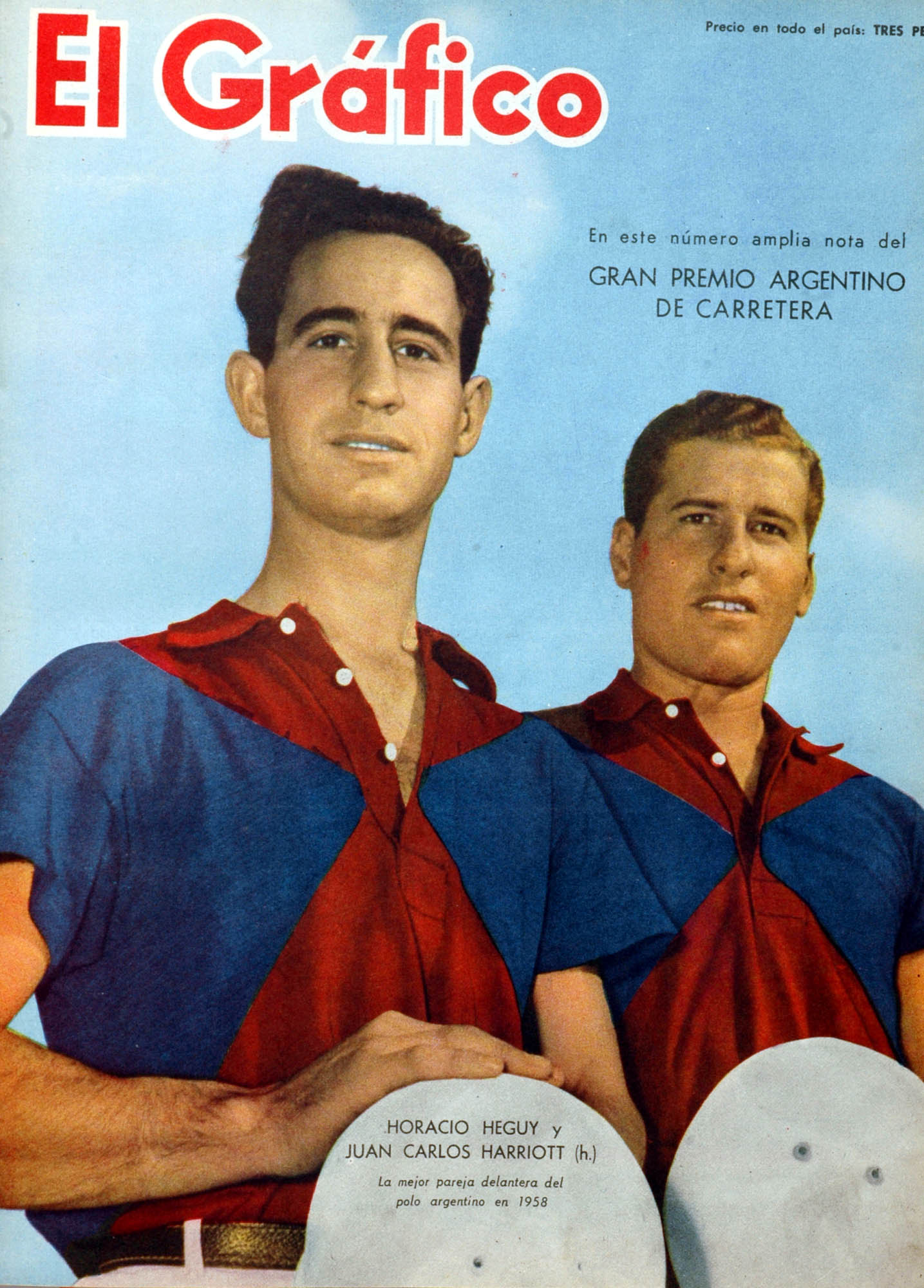
Horacio Heguy and Juan Carlos Harriott Jr.

Juan C. Harriott Jr. died on 11 September 2023, at the age of 86.

== Tournament results ==
Argentine Polo Open Championship (20): 1957, 1958, 1959, 1961, 1962, 1963, 1964, 1965, 1967, 1968, 1969, 1970, 1971, 1972, 1974, 1975, 1976, 1977, 1978 and 1979.
