= Hurlingham Gardens =

- Location within Gauteng Location within South Africa
- Coordinates: 26.101°S 28.029°E
- Country: South Africa
- Province: Gauteng
- Municipality: City of Johannesburg
- Main Place: Sandton

Area
  - Total: 2.76 km^{2} (1.07 sq mi)

Population (2011)
  - Total: 3,928
  - Density: 1,420/km^{2} (3,690/sq mi)

Racial makeup (2011)
  - Black African: 28.6%
  - Coloured: 2.0%
  - Indian/Asian: 5.4%
  - White: 62.4%
  - Other: 1.5%

First languages (2011)
  - English: 70.1%
  - Afrikaans: 7.2%
  - Zulu: 5.8%
  - Northern Sotho: 2.6%
  - Other: 14.3%
- Time zone: UTC+2 (SAST)

Hurlingham Gardens is a suburb of Johannesburg, South Africa. It is located in Region B of the City of Johannesburg Metropolitan Municipality.
