= John Hopwood (cricketer) =

English cricketer

Personal information
- Full name: John Anthony Hopwood
- Born: 23 October 1926; Herne Bay, Kent
- Died: May 2002 (aged 75); Fleetwood, Lancashire, England, UK
- Batting: Right-handed

Career statistics
Competition	First-class
Matches	1
Runs scored	9
Batting average	4.50
100s/50s	0/0
Top score	8
Catches/stumpings	0/–
- Source: Cricinfo, 15 April 2013

John Anthony Hopwood (23 October 1926 – May 2002) was an English cricketer. Hopwood was a right-handed batsman. He was born at Herne Bay, Kent, and was educated at Dulwich College.

Hopwood made a single first-class appearance for the Free Foresters against Cambridge University at Fenner's in 1951. In a match which ended as a draw, Hopwood opened the batting in the Free Foresters first-innings, scoring 8 runs before he was dismissed by Owen Wait, while in their second-innings he again opened the batting and was dismissed by the same bowler for a single run. This was his only first-class appearance.

He died at Fleetwood, Lancashire in May 2002.
