= David Stirling (polo player) =

Uruguayan polo player

David Stirling Jr.
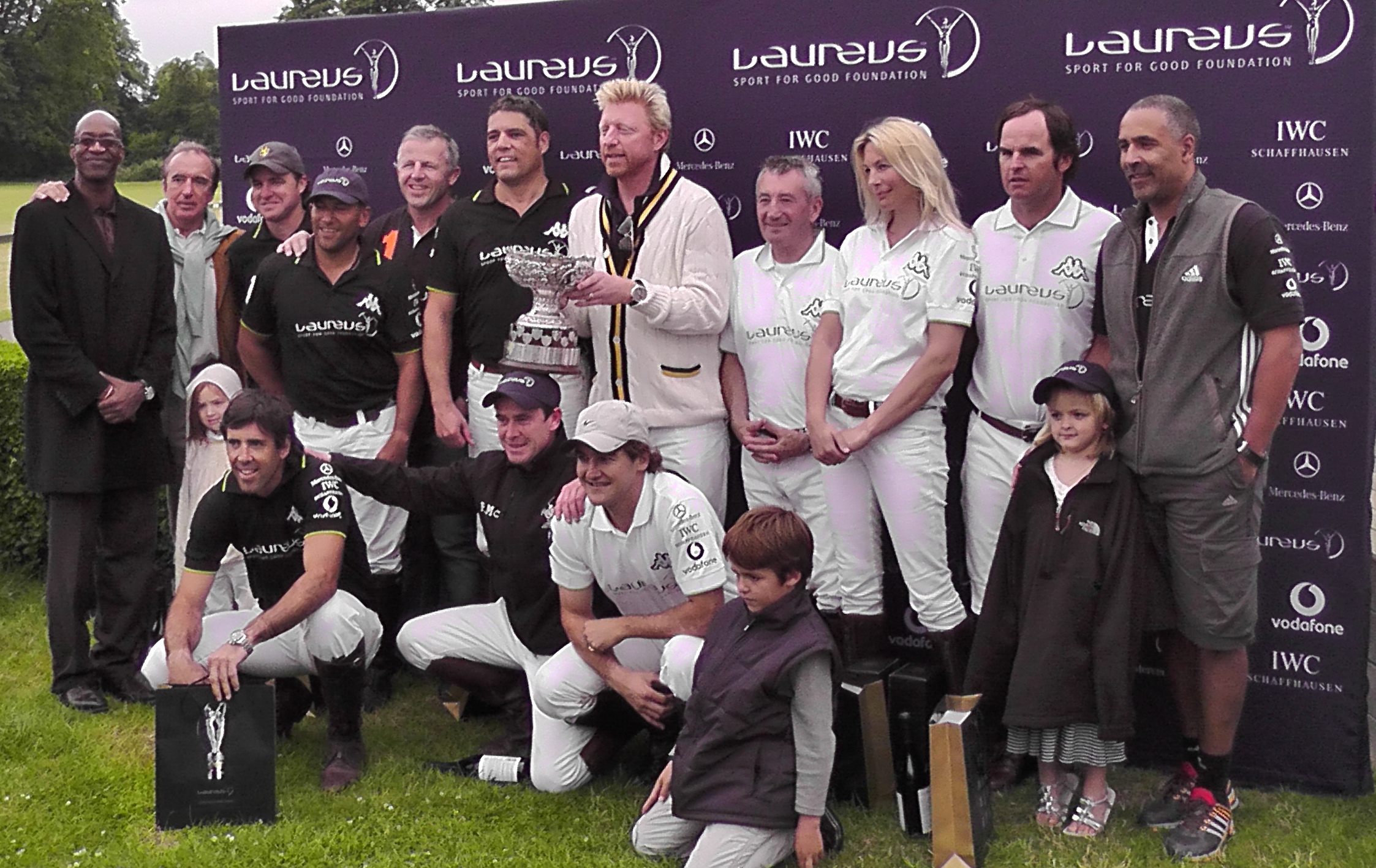
- David Stirling (front, white shirt)

Personal information
- Nickname: Pelón
- Born: 4 January 1981 (age 45) Young, Río Negro Department

Sport
- Sport: Polo
- Rank: 6th (10-goal handicap)
- Team: La Dolfina (2010-present); Indios Chapaleufú II (2009-2010)

Achievements and titles
- World finals: Abierto de Polo with La Dolfina: 2011, 2013, 2014
- Highest world ranking: 3rd
- Updated on 10 December 2014

David Stirling Jr. (born January 4, 1981, in Young, Río Negro Department) is an Uruguayan polo player with a 10-goal handicap who currently plays in Argentina for La Dolfina Polo Team. He is ranked number 6, and considered one of the best polo players in the world. He is often referred to as Pelón. He won three consecutive Argentine Triple Crowns from 2013 to 2015.

== Controversies ==
In 2024, he was accused of being involved in a money laundering network, headed by Alessandro Bazzoni and Siri Evjemo-Nysveen, dedicated to the purchase of polo horses with money from corruption in the Venezuelan oil company PDVSA through the companies CGC One Planet and Clareville Grove Capital.
