= Carlos Gracida =

Mexican-American polo player (1960–2014)

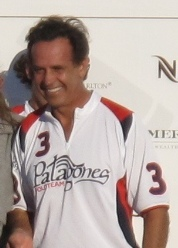
- Carlos Gracida at the International Polo Club, Ylvisaker Cup Tournament, 2010.
- Born: September 5, 1960; Mexico City
- Died: February 25, 2014 (aged 53); Delray Beach, Florida
- Children: Carlos Jr., Mariano, María-Camila
- Father: Guillermo Gracida

Carlos Gracida (September 5, 1960 – February 25, 2014) was a Mexican-American polo player. He reached a 10-goal handicap at the age of 25.

== Biography ==
Gracida was born in Mexico City. As a product of the Gracida polo dynasty, Carlos began playing when he was only five years old and began competing at the age of ten. His father Guillermo was a 9-goaler who played in Meadowbrook and Palermo in Argentina and still enjoyed the distinction of 5-goals at the age of 65. Gracida first reached 10 goals in 1985, and spent over fifteen years at this handicap. He was a member of Ellerstina, the legendary team owned by Australian magnate Kerry Packer, and also of La Espadana.

In 1994 Gracida won nearly every possible tournament in the game, including the Argentinian Triple Crown of Hurlingham, Tortuguitas and Palermo. That same year, he also won the US Open and the British Open Gold Cup, becoming the only player in history to win the Grand Slam of Polo, in 1987, a feat he replicated twice, in 1988 and 1994.

Alongside his brother Guillermo Gracida (often referred to as Memo), Gracida won Player of the Year in America five times, the only other player to do so in history. He racked up more tournament wins than any player in the history of the game. Along with his Mexican countrymen Antonio Herrera and his brother Memo, he was one of three foreigners to win the Abierto Argentino de Palermo, considered the most prestigious tournament, all Mexicans. He won it five times. He was also the only foreigner to have won the Olimpia de Plata, Argentina's Most Valuable Player Award, which he picked up in 1988. He won the British Open Gold Cup ten times, more than any other player, and won the US Open nine times. He reached 10 goals in 1985 and spent fifteen years on and off at 10 goals, including the 2006 season in Palm Beach.

Gracida was ranked 9 goals in England, where he was reportedly HM Queen Elizabeth's favorite player. He was a favorite instructor with celebrities and royalty and gave lessons to HRH Prince Charles, HRH Prince William, HRH Prince Harry, King Constantine II of Greece, HRH Prince Talal of Jordan, James Packer and Sylvester Stallone.

Gracida's most famous horse was Chesney, who won the Best Playing Pony award numerous times, including in 1988, 1989 and 1991 at the British Open Gold Cup. His personal favorite was Nony Nony, a seven time Gold Cup winner in England. He was inducted into the Museum of Polo and Hall of Fame in 2012.

Gracida lived in Wellington, Florida, with his two sons, Carlitos and Mariano, as well as his girlfriend of three years, Monica Sierra. On February 25, 2014, Gracida died of injuries suffered in a match that afternoon at the Everglades Polo Club in Wellington. He was reportedly injured when his horse was accidentally struck in the head with a mallet, causing the animal to jerk its head and hit Gracida. He was transported to Delray Medical Center in critical condition and later died there.

Gracida became a US citizen two months before his death. Fiancée Monica Sierra gave birth to their daughter four months after his death, Maria-Camila Gracida-Sierra, on May 16, 2014. She became the subject of a paternity suit.
