= David Stirling (footballer) =

Australian rules footballer

Personal information
- Born: 10 September 1962 (age 64)
- Original team: Springvale
- Height: 183 cm (6 ft 0 in)
- Weight: 70 kg (154 lb)

Playing career^{1}
Years	Club	Games (Goals)
1983	Sydney Swans	7 (5)
- ^{1} Playing statistics correct to the end of 1983.

David Stirling (born 10 September 1962) is a former Australian rules footballer who played with the Sydney Swans in the Victorian Football League (VFL).

Stirling, a half forward flanker and wingman, came to the Swans from Springvale. He missed the start of the 1983 VFL season with a hamstring injury, before debuting in Sydney's round 11 win over Footscray at the Sydney Cricket Ground, one of seven appearances that year.
