= Howard Hipwood =

English polo player (1950–2023)

- Born: March 24, 1950
- Died: June 6, 2023 (aged 73)
- Occupation: Polo player

Howard Hipwood (March 24, 1950 – June 6, 2023) was an English polo player and captain of the England team. He won the Cowdray Park Gold Cup in 1990 and the Coronation Cup in 1979, 1982, 1983, 1990, 1993 and 1996.

In obituaries, he was described as "one of England's greatest polo players" by Horse & Hound, and as "the country's most famous polo player after the King" by The Telegraph, which noted he was initially an outsider.

Alongside his brother Julian, he is the namesake of the Julian & Howard Hipwood at the Royal County of Berkshire Polo Club.
