= Alejandro Díaz-Alberdi =

Alejandro Díaz-Alberdi (Piki) is an Argentine 7-goal professional polo player. He was at one stage in his career rated at 10 goals, the highest handicap a player can receive. Diaz-Alberdi, a player on the Dutta Corp polo team and La Mancha Polo team has won many important tournaments during his career all around the world including The Argentine open once, the British open, the queens cup, the soto grande gold and silver cups, the copa Republica Argentina, Camara de Disputados and many others.

During a 20-year career Diaz-Alberdi has won many of the top competitions including the Argentine open in 1996.

== Early years ==
He was born on 1 April 1963 in Buenos Aires, son of Juan Jose Diaz Alberdi and Emma Martin. He has 5 siblings: Juan Jose, Luisa, Dolores, Victoria and James. He started playing polo at the age of 14, in his Campo called ¨LA LUISA¨. He played Potrillos cup at the age of 14.

== Career ==
He won three years in a row Camara de Disputados cup. In 1993, 1999 and 2005 He won the British open integrating the teams Alcatel, Pommery and Dubai. In 1996 he won The Argentine Open with Indios Chapaleufu 2. He won The Sotogrande Gold and Silver cups. 2009 won the Ellerstina gold cup. In 2015 he won with his son Lucas Playing For la Mancha he won Republica Argentina cup.
