= Campeonato Argentino Abierto de Polo =

International polo championship held in Brazil

Campeonato Argentino
- Most recent season or competition: 2025
- Formerly: River Plate Polo Championship
- Sport: Polo
- Founded: 1893; 133 years ago
- Organising body: AAP
- No. of teams: 10
- Country: Argentina
- Venue: Campo Argentino de Polo
- Most recent champion: La Dolfina Natividad (16th. title) (2025)
- Most titles: Coronel Suárez (25 titles)
- Broadcaster: ESPN
- Level on pyramid: 1
- Website: aapolo.com/palermo

The Campeonato Argentino Abierto de Polo (Spanish for Argentine Open Polo Championship) is an international polo championship at club level, organised every year since 1893 at the Campo Argentino de Polo of Palermo, Buenos Aires.

It was known as the "River Plate Polo Championship" between 1893-1923, and as well as the other two main polo events in Argentina (the Campeonato Abierto de Hurlingham at the Hurlingham Club and the Campeonato Abierto del Tortugas Country Club), the handicap of the teams must be between 28 and 40 goals. It is organized by the Asociación Argentina de Polo (Argentine Polo Association).

In 1975, Coronel Suárez became the first team in history to play in the tournament with a maximum handicap of 40 goals.

The individual record holder with the most Argentine Open Polo Championship victories is Juan C. Harriott Jr. with 20 total championships.

The individual with the greatest length of time between their first victory and their latest victory is Adolfo Cambiaso (1994 to 2025) with 31 years between his first and most recent championships. The individual with the second greatest length of such time is Enrique Alberdi (1934 to 1957) with 23 years between his first championship and his last championship.

The youngest person to ever win the Argentine Open Polo Championship is Adolfo "Poroto" Cambiaso Jr.) who won it in 2022 at age 17 years and 6 days while playing for La Dolfina. The second youngest to ever win the Championship is Benjamin Araya who won it in 1980 at the age of 17 years, four months, and one day while playing for Coronel Suárez. The third youngest person to ever win the Championship was José E. Traill who won it in 1904 at the age of 17 years, four months, and eighteen days while playing for the North Santa Fe team.

The only non-Argentine team to ever win the Championship was the American team in 1932. A group of Americans came to Buenos Aires to play in the 1932 Championship with four of them forming the Meadow Brook team. The Meadow Brook team consisted of Mike Phipps, Winston Guest, Elmer Boeseke Jr., and Billy Post. They beat Santa Paula (Luis Nelson, Martín Reynal, José Reynal, Manuel Andrada) by a score of 8 to 7 in the 1932 final. Notable from that year was that the reserve Americans played for a number of the local Argentine teams. Seymour Knox played for La Pampa, Stewart B. Iglehart and Stephen Sanford played for Santa Inés, Jimmy Mills played for Venado Tuerto, and Pat Roark played for Los Pingüinos.

== List of champions ==
The first championship was held in 1893, being won by Hurlingham. Below is the list of the champions (replacements during the final match are in parentheses next to player replaced).

Tournament name

- 1893–1922: Polo Association of the River Plate Championship
- 1923–present: Campeonato Argentino Abierto de Polo

Year	Team	Players/Handicap	Total H.
1893-Apr	Hurlingham	Francisco J. Balfour, John Ravenscroft (Thomas Parry), Robert W. Isherwood, Hugh Scott Robson	n/i
1893-Oct	Hurlingham	Francisco J. Balfour, Frank Furber, Cadwallader J. Tetley, Hugo Scott Robson (John Ravenscroft)	n/i
1894-Mar	The Casuals	Arthur Follet Holt, Francis S. Robinson, Robert Mc Smyth, Percy Talbot	n/i
1894-Oct	Flores Athletic	John Bennett, Frederick J. Bennett, Thomas Scout Robson, Hugo Scott Robson	n/i
1895-Apr	Las Petacas	Francisco Benítez, José Martínez, Francis E. Kinchant, Sixto Martínez	n/i
1895-Oct	The Casuals	Cadwallader J. Tetley, Robert L. Scott-Moncrieff, Percy Talbot, Arthur Follett Holt	n/i
1896	Las Petacas	José Martínez, Sixto Martínez, Francis E. Kinchant, Francisco Benítez	n/i
1897	Hurlingham "A"	Murdoch Finlayson, Frank Furber, Arthur Follet Holt, Hugo Scott Robson	n/i
1898	The Casuals	Frank B. Hinchliff, Eduardo Traill, Roberto W.Traill, Francis S. Robinson	n/i
1899	Hurlingham "A"	Francisco J. Balfour, F.J. Bennet, Thomas Scott Robson, Hugo Scott Robson	n/i
1900	La Victoria	Chamberlain F.T. Hinchliff, James L. Bury, Magnus Fea, Francis E. Kinchant	n/i
1901	San Carlos	Percy Talbot, Roque Fredes, Juan Carrizo, Gastón Peers	n/i
1902	Hurlingham "B"	Francisco J. Balfour, Edward C. Robson, Thomas Scott Robson, Bernard Ryland-Bedford	n/i
1903	Hurlingham	Francisco J. Balfour, Guillermo P. Robson, Thomas Scott Robson, Hugo Scott Robson	n/i
1904	North Santa Fe	José E. Traill, Eduardo Traill, Juan A. E. Traill, Roberto W. Traill	n/i
1905	Hurlingham	Edward C. Robson, Thomas Scott Robson, Hugo Scott Robson, Bernard Ryland-Bedford	n/i
1906	North Santa Fe	José E. Traill, Juan A. E. Traill, Roberto Traill, José González	n/i
1907	Western Camps	Juan Campbell, Ricardo Leared, H. Drysdale, Eduardo Lucero	n/i
1908	North Santa Fe	José E. Traill, Eduardo Traill, Juan A. E. Traill, Roberto Traill	n/i
1909	Western Camps	Juan Campbell, Ricardo Leared, H. Drysdale, Eduardo Lucero	n/i
1910	Las Rosas	Carlos Watts, Roberto Guillermo Best, Juan A. E. Traill, Count E. de Galleani	n/i
1911	North Santa Fe	Geoffrey Francis, L. A. Lynch Staunton, Roberto Traill, Juan A. E. Traill	n/i
1912	North Santa Fe	Geoffrey Francis, L. A. Lynch Staunton, Roberto Traill, Juan A. E. Traill	n/i
1913	North Santa Fe	José E. Traill 9, L. A. Lynch Staunton 6, Roberto Traill 8, Juan A. E. Traill 10	33
1914	(Not played due to World War I)		
1915	El Palomar	Lindsay Holway 5, Samuel Casares 6, Charles Lacey 5, Luis L. Lacey 10	26
1916	North Santa Fe	Juan Miles 3, David Miles 6, Carlos Land 6, Juan A. E. Traill 10	25
1917	North Santa Fe	Juan Miles 5, David Miles 7, Carlos Land 6, Juan A. E. Traill 10	28
1918	Hurlingham	Juan Roberts 4, C. Crawford Smith 5, Julio Negrón 6, Juan A. E. Traill 10	25
1919	Las Rosas	Guillermo Benitz 5, Juan Miles 6, David Miles 7, Carlos Land 6	24
1920	Hurlingham	Arturo Kenny 5, Juan D. Nelson 6, Julio Negrón 6, Luis L. Lacey 9	26
1921	Hurlingham	Arturo Kenny 5, Juan D. Nelson 6, Julio Negrón 6, Luis L. Lacey 9	26
1922	Santa Inés	Daniel Kearney 3, Carlos Land 6, Guillermo Brooke Naylor 4, Juan Kearney 2	15
1923	Las Rosas	Juan Miles 7, José E. Traill 6, Juan A. E. Traill 9, David Miles 8	30
1924	Santa Inés	Daniel Kearney 5, Carlos Land 7, Guillermo Brooke Naylor 5, Juan Kearney 5	22
1925	Hurlingham	Arturo Kenny 6, Juan D. Nelson 8, Eustace Lacey 6, Luis L. Lacey 10	30
1926	Hurlingham	Francisco Ceballos 3, Ramón Videla Dorna 4, Justo Galarreta 4, Enrique Padilla 7	18
1927	Hurlingham	Arturo Kenny 6, Juan D. Nelson 8, Julio Negrón 4, Luis L. Lacey 9	27
1928	Santa Inés	Daniel Kearney 6, Guillermo Brooke Naylor 6, Kenneth Reynolds 3, Juan Kearney 6	21
1929	Hurlingham	Arturo Kenny 6, Juan D. Nelson 8, Enrique Padilla 7, Luis L. Lacey 10	31
1930	Santa Paula	Alfredo Harrington 5, Juan Reynal 6, José Reynal 8, Manuel Andrada 8	27
1931	La Rinconada	Audilio Ayrolo 4, Martín Reynal 5, José Reynal 8, Manuel Andrada 8	25
1932	Meadow Brook	Michael Phipps 7, Winston Guest 9, Elmer Boeseke Jr. 8, William Post 6	30
1933	Santa Paula	Juan Reynal 7, Martín Reynal 6, José Reynal 8, Manuel Andrada 8	29
1934	Coronel Suárez	Ricardo Garrós 4, Eduardo E. Garrós 4, Enrique Alberdi 7, Juan Alberdi 5	20
1935	Tortugas	Juan Alberdi 6, Mario Inchauspe 5, Enrique Alberdi 7, Manuel Andrada 7	25
1936	Santa Paula	Juan Reynal 6, Matías Casares 6, José Reynal 9, Ricardo Santamarina 6	27
1937	Hurlingham	Eduardo Rojas Lanusse 5, Juan D. Nelson 6, Roberto Cavanagh 8, Luis L. Lacey 7	26
1938	Los Indios	Audilio Ayrolo 4, Juan Rodríguez 6, Andrés Gazzotti 8, Manuel Andrada 8	26
1939	El Trébol	Luis Duggan 6, Heriberto Duggan 7, Enrique Duggan 5, Manuel Andrada 9	27
1940	El Trébol	Luis Duggan 6, Julio Menditeguy 6, Heriberto Duggan 7, Carlos Menditeguy 6	25
1941	El Trébol	Luis Duggan 7, Julio Menditeguy 7, Heriberto Duggan 8, Carlos Menditeguy 7	29
1942	El Trébol	Luis Duggan 8, Julio Menditeguy 8, Heriberto Duggan 9, Carlos Menditeguy 8	33
1943	El Trébol	Luis Duggan 9, Julio Menditeguy 9, Heriberto Duggan 9, Carlos Menditeguy 9	36
1944	Venado Tuerto	Juan Cavanagh 6, Roberto Cavanagh 7, Enrique Alberdi 10, Juan Alberdi 9	32
1945	(Not played due to World War II)		
1946	Venado Tuerto	Juan Cavanagh 8, Roberto Cavanagh 8, Enrique Alberdi 10, Juan Alberdi 10	36
1947	Venado Tuerto	Juan Cavanagh 8, Roberto Cavanagh 8, Enrique Alberdi 9, Juan Alberdi 9	34
1948	Venado Tuerto	Juan Cavanagh 9, Roberto Cavanagh 9, Enrique Alberdi 9, Juan Alberdi 9	36
1949	Venado Tuerto	Luis Duggan 7, Juan Cavanagh 9, Enrique Alberdi 9, Juan Alberdi 9	34
1950	Venado Tuerto	Juan Cavanagh 9, Roberto Cavanagh 9, Enrique Alberdi 9, Juan Alberdi 10	37
1951	Los Pingüinos	Luis Duggan 7, Iván Mihanovich 6, Gabriel Capdepont 7, Mariano G. Achával 7	27
1952	Coronel Suárez	Ruben Sarraúa 5, Francisco Reyes 7, Enrique Alberdi 9, Juan C. Harriott 8	29
1953	Coronel Suárez	Ernesto Lalor 6, Francisco Reyes Carrere 8, Enrique Alberdi 9, Juan C. Alberdi 9	32
1954	El Trébol	Nicolas R. Guiñazú 7, Robert Skene 10, Carlos Menditeguy 10, Eduardo Bullrich 7	34
1955	Venado Tuerto	Juan Cavanagh 9, Roberto Cavanagh 10, Enrique Alberdi 10, Juan Alberdi 9	38
1956	El Trébol	Eduardo Bullrich 7, Julio Menditeguy 7, Robert Skene 10, Carlos Menditeguy 9	33
1957	Coronel Suárez	Bertil Grahn 6, Juan C. Harriott Jr. 7, Enrique Alberdi 9, Juan C. Harriott 7	29
1958	Coronel Suárez	Horacio Heguy 6, Juan C. Harriott Jr. 8, Antonio Heguy 5, Juan C. Harriott 8	27
1959	Coronel Suárez	Horacio Heguy 7, Juan C. Harriott Jr. 9, Luis Lalor 7, Juan C. Harriott 8	31
1960	El Trébol	Horacio Castilla 4, Teófilo Bordeu 7, Carlos de la Serna 8, Carlos Menditeguy 10	29
1961	Coronel Suárez	Horacio Heguy 8, Daniel González 6, Juan C. Harriott Jr. 9, Juan C. Harriott 8	31
1962	Coronel Suárez	Horacio Heguy 9, Daniel González 6, Juan C. Harriott Jr. 10, Juan C. Harriott 7	32
1963	Coronel Suárez	Alberto Heguy 6, Horacio Heguy 8, Juan C. Harriott Jr. 10, Juan C. Harriott 7	31
1964	Coronel Suárez	Alberto Heguy 7, Horacio Heguy 9, Juan C. Harriott Jr. 10, Juan C. Harriott 7 (Carlos Torres Zavaleta)	33
1965	Coronel Suárez	Alberto Heguy 7, Horacio Heguy 9, Juan C. Harriott Jr. 10, Daniel González 7	33
1966	Coronel Suárez	Alberto Heguy 8 (William R. Linfoot), Horacio Heguy 9, Juan C. Harriott Jr. 10, Daniel González 8	35
1967	Coronel Suárez	Alberto Heguy 9, Horacio Heguy 9, Juan C. Harriott Jr. 10, Alfredo Harriott 7	35
1968	Coronel Suárez	Alberto Heguy 8, Horacio Heguy 8, Juan C. Harriott Jr. 10, Alfredo Harriott 7	33
1969	Coronel Suárez	Alberto Heguy 8, Horacio Heguy 9, Juan C. Harriott Jr. 10, Alfredo Harriott 8	35
1970	Coronel Suárez	Alberto Heguy 8, Horacio Heguy 9, Juan C. Harriott Jr. 10, Alfredo Harriott 9	36
1971	Santa Ana	Teófilo Bordeu 7, Gastón Dorignac 10, Daniel González 9, Francisco Dorignac 10	36
1972	Coronel Suárez	Alberto Heguy 9, Horacio Heguy 10, Juan C. Harriott Jr. 10, Alfredo Harriott 9	38
1973	Santa Ana	Gastón Dorignac 10, Héctor Merlos 8, Daniel González 9, Francisco Dorignac 10	37
1974	Coronel Suárez	Alberto Heguy 9, Horacio Heguy 9, Juan C. Harriott Jr. 10, Alfredo Harriott 9	37
1975	Coronel Suárez	Alberto Heguy 10, Horacio Heguy 10, Juan C. Harriott Jr. 10, Alfredo Harriott 10	40
1976	Coronel Suárez	Alberto Heguy 10, Horacio Heguy 9, Juan C. Harriott Jr. 10, Alfredo Harriott 10	39
1977	Coronel Suárez	Alberto Heguy 10, Horacio Heguy 10, Juan C. Harriott Jr. 10, Alfredo Harriott 10	40
1978	Coronel Suárez	Alberto Heguy 10, Horacio Heguy 10, Juan C. Harriott Jr. 10, Alfredo Harriott 10	40
1979	Coronel Suárez	Alberto Heguy 10, Horacio Heguy 10, Juan C. Harriott Jr. 10, Alfredo Harriott 10	40
1980	Coronel Suárez	Benjamín Araya 5, Alberto Heguy 10, Alfredo Harriott 10, Celestino Garrós 8 (Horacio Heguy)	33
1981	Coronel Suárez	Benjamín Araya 7, Alberto Heguy 10, Alfredo Harriott 10, Celestino Garrós 9	36
1982	Santa Ana	Gastón Dorignac 9, Héctor Merlos 8, Guillermo ("Memo") Gracida Jr 10, Francisco Dorignac 9	36
1983	Coronel Suárez II	Benjamín Araya 9, Juan Badiola 8, Daniel González 8, Horacio Araya 8	33
1984	La Espadaña	Juan Zavaleta 8, Alfonso Pieres 9, Gonzalo Pieres Sr. 9, Ernesto Trotz Jr. 8	34
1985 (Note: Concluded in 1986 due to epizootic.)	La Espadaña	Antonio Herrera 8, Alfonso Pieres 10, Gonzalo Pieres Sr. 10, Ernesto Trotz Jr. 9	37
1986	Indios Chapaleufú	Marcos Heguy 7, Gonzalo Heguy 8, Horacio Heguy Jr. 8, Alejandro Garrahan 8	31
1987	La Espadaña	Carlos Gracida 9, Alfonso Pieres 10, Gonzalo Pieres Sr. 10, Ernesto Trotz Jr. 10	39
1988	La Espadaña	Carlos Gracida 9, Alfonso Pieres 10, Gonzalo Pieres Sr. 10, Ernesto Trotz Jr. 10	39
1989	La Espadaña	Carlos Gracida 10, Alfonso Pieres 10, Gonzalo Pieres Sr. 10, Ernesto Trotz Jr. 10	40
1990	La Espadaña	Carlos Gracida 10, Alfonso Pieres 10, Gonzalo Pieres Sr. 10, Ernesto Trotz Jr. 10	40
1991	Indios Chapaleufú	Bautista Heguy 8, Gonzalo Heguy 10, Horacio Heguy Jr. 10, Marcos Heguy 9	37
1992	Indios Chapaleufú	Bautista Heguy 10, Gonzalo Heguy 10, Horacio Heguy Jr. 10, Marcos Heguy 10	40
1993	Indios Chapaleufú	Bautista Heguy 10, Gonzalo Heguy 10, Horacio Heguy Jr. 10, Marcos Heguy 10	40
1994	La Ellerstina	Adolfo Cambiaso 9, Mariano Aguerre 8, Gonzalo Pieres Sr. 10, Carlos Gracida 10	37
1995	Indios Chapaleufú	Bautista Heguy 10, Gonzalo Heguy 10, Horacio Heguy Jr. 10, Marcos Heguy 10	40
1996	Indios Chapaleufú II	Alberto Heguy Jr. 9, Ignacio Heguy 9, Alejandro Díaz Alberdi 9, Eduardo Heguy 10	37
1997	La Ellerstina	Adolfo Cambiaso 10, Mariano Aguerre 9, Gonzalo Pieres Sr. 10, Bartolomé Castagnola 8	37
1998	La Ellerstina	Adolfo Cambiaso 10, Mariano Aguerre 9, Gonzalo Pieres Sr. 10, Bartolomé Castagnola 9	38
1999	Indios Chapaleufú II	Alberto Heguy Jr. 9, Ignacio Heguy 10, Milo Fernández Araujo 8, Eduardo Heguy 10	37
2000	Indios Chapaleufú II	Alberto Heguy Jr. 9, Ignacio Heguy 10, Milo Fernández Araujo 9, Eduardo Heguy 10	38
2001	Indios Chapaleufú	Bautista Heguy 10, Mariano Aguerre 10, Marcos Heguy 10, Horacio Heguy Jr. 8	38
2002	La Dolfina	Adolfo Cambiaso 10, Sebastián Merlos 9, Juan I. Merlos 10, Bartolomé Castagnola 9	38
2003	La Aguada	Javier Novillo 9, Eduardo Novillo Jr. 9, Miguel Novillo 9, Ignacio Novillo 7	34
2004	Indios Chapaleufú II	Alberto Heguy Jr. 9, Ignacio Heguy 10, Milo Fernández Araujo 9, Eduardo Heguy 9	37
2005	La Dolfina	Adolfo Cambiaso 10, Lucas Monteverde Jr. 8, Mariano Aguerre 9, Bartolomé Castagnola 9	36
2006	La Dolfina	Adolfo Cambiaso 10, Lucas Monteverde Jr. 9, Mariano Aguerre 10, Bartolomé Castagnola 10	39
2007	La Dolfina	Adolfo Cambiaso 10, Lucas Monteverde Jr. 9, Mariano Aguerre 10, Bartolomé Castagnola 10	39
2008	La Ellerstina	Facundo Pieres 10, Gonzalo Pieres Jr. 10, Pablo Mac Donough 10, Juan M. Nero 9	39
2009	La Dolfina	Adolfo Cambiaso 10, Lucas Monteverde Jr. 10, Mariano Aguerre 10, Bartolomé Castagnola 10	40
2010	La Ellerstina	Facundo Pieres 10, Gonzalo Pieres Jr. 10, Pablo Mac Donough 10, Juan M. Nero 10	40
2011	La Dolfina	Adolfo Cambiaso 10, David Stirling Jr. 9, Pablo Mac Donough 10, Juan M. Nero 10	39
2012	La Ellerstina	Facundo Pieres 10, Gonzalo Pieres Jr. 10, Mariano Aguerre 9, Nicolás Pieres 9	38
2013	La Dolfina	Adolfo Cambiaso 10, David Stirling Jr. 9, Pablo Mac Donough 10, Juan M. Nero 10 (Sebastián Merlos)	39
2014	La Dolfina	Adolfo Cambiaso 10, David Stirling Jr. 10, Pablo Mac Donough 10, Juan M. Nero 10	40
2015	La Dolfina	Adolfo Cambiaso 10, David Stirling Jr. 10, Pablo Mac Donough 10, Juan M. Nero 10	40
2016	La Dolfina	Adolfo Cambiaso 10, David Stirling Jr. 10, Pablo Mac Donough 10, Juan M. Nero 10	40
2017	La Dolfina	Adolfo Cambiaso 10, David Stirling Jr. 10, Pablo Mac Donough 10, Juan M. Nero 10	40
2018	La Dolfina	Adolfo Cambiaso 10, David Stirling Jr. 10, Pablo Mac Donough 10, Juan M. Nero 10	40
2019	La Dolfina	Adolfo Cambiaso 10, David Stirling Jr. 10, Pablo Mac Donough 10, Juan M. Nero 10 (Rodrigo Andrade 8)	40
2020	La Dolfina	Adolfo Cambiaso 10, David Stirling Jr. 10, Pablo Mac Donough 10, Juan M. Nero 10	40
2021	La Natividad	Pablo Pieres 9, Ignatius Du Plessis 9, Bartolomé Castagnola Jr. 9, Camilo Castagnola 9	36
2022	La Dolfina	Adolfo Cambiaso 10, Adolfo Cambiaso Jr. 9, David Stirling Jr. 10, Juan M. Nero 10	39
2023	La Natividad	Facundo Pieres 9, Camilo Castagnola 10, Pablo Mac Donough 10, Bartolomé Castagnola Jr. 10	39
2024	La Natividad	Camilo Castagnola 10, Facundo Pieres 10, Pablo Mac Donough 10, Bartolomé Castagnola Jr. 10	40
2025	La Natividad La Dolfina	Camilo Castagnola 10, Adolfo Cambiaso Jr. 10, Adolfo Cambiaso 10, Bartolomé Castagnola Jr. 10	40

== Multiple championship winners ==
Player	Titles	First Title	Age at First Title	Most Recent Title
Juan C. Harriott Jr.	20	1957	21	1979
Horacio Heguy Sr. (Note: Horacio Heguy Sr. made an appearance in Final of 1980, and so arguably could be credited with 20 championship titles.)	19	1958	22	1979
Adolfo Cambiaso	19	1994	19	2025
Alberto Heguy Sr.	17	1963	22	1981
Alfredo Harriott	13	1967	22	1981
Pablo Mac Donough	13	2008	26	2024
Enrique Alberdi	12	1934	24	1957
Juan Martin Nero	12	2008	27	2022
Juan A. E. Traill	11	1904	22	1923
Mariano Aguerre	9	1994	25	2012
Juan Alberdi	9	1934		1955
Gonzalo Pieres Sr.	9	1984	28	1998
Juan C. Harriott	8	1952	40	1964
David Stirling Jr	9	2011	30	2020
Bartolomé Castagnola	7	1997	27	2009
Juan Cavanagh	7	1944		1955
Roberto Cavanagh	7	1937	23	1955
Luis Duggan	7	1939	33	1951
Daniel González	7	1961		1983
Luis L. Lacey	7	1915	28	1937
Carlos Menditeguy	7	1940	26	1960
Hugo Scott Robson	7	1893	34	1905
Manuel Andrada	6	1930	40	1939
Horacio Heguy Jr.	6	1986	22	2001
Marcos Heguy	6	1986	20	2001
Juan D. Nelson	6	1920	29	1937
Alfonso Pieres	6	1984	30	1990
Ernesto Trotz Jr.	6	1984	28	1990
Francisco J. Balfour	5	1893		1903
Heriberto Duggan	5	1939		1943
Carlos Gracida	5	1987	27	1994
Bautista Heguy	5	1991	20	2001
Gonzalo Heguy	5	1986	22	1995
Facundo Pieres	5	2008	22	2024
Arturo Kenny	5	1920		1929
Carlos Land	5	1916		1924
Julio Menditeguy	5	1940		1956
José E. Traill	5	1904	17	1923
Alberto Heguy Jr.	4	1996	26	2004
Eduardo Heguy	4	1996	26	2004
Ignacio Heguy	4	1996	22	2004
David Miles	4	1916		1923
Juan Miles	4	1916	21	1923
Lucas Monteverde Jr.	4	2005	28	2009
Julio Negrón	4	1918		1927
José Reynal	4	1930		1936
Thomas Scott Robson	4	1899		1905
Roberto Traill	4	1906		1913
Camilo “Jeta” Castagnola	4	2021	19	2025
Bartolomé Castagnola Jr	4	2021	21	2025
Milo Fernández Araujo	3	1999	33	2004
Benjamín Araya	3	1980	17	1983
Francisco Dorignac	3	1971	33	1982
Gastón Dorignac	3	1971	31	1982
Frank Furber	3	1893		1897
Arthur Follet Holt	3	1894	29	1897
Daniel Kearney	3	1922		1928
Juan Kearney	3	1922		1928
Francis E. Kinchant	3	1895		1900
Guillermo Brooke Naylor	3	1922	38	1928
Gonzalo Pieres Jr.	3	2008	25	2012
Juan Reynal	3	1930		1936
L. A. Lynch Staunton	3	1911		1913
Eduardo Traill	3	1898		1908

== Championship winners with greatest number of unique teammates ==
Player	Unique Teammates (Note: Total count of unique teammates across all championships won.)	Teammate Change Ratio (Note: Ratio of unique teammates per championship won.)	Titles
Juan A. E. Traill	15	1.36	11
Enrique Alberdi	15	1.25	12
Adolfo Cambiaso	13	0.68	19
Mariano Aguerre	11	1.22	9
Juan C. Harriott Jr.	9	0.45	20
Juan Alberdi	8	0.89	9
Horacio Heguy Sr	8	0.42	19
Alberto Heguy	7	0.41	17

== Titles by club ==
Team	Titles
Coronel Suárez	25
La Dolfina	16
Hurlingham	15
North Santa Fe	8
El Trébol	8
Venado Tuerto	7
La Espadaña	6
Indios Chapaleufú I	6
Ellerstina	6
Indios Chapaleufú II	4
The Casuals	3
Las Rosas	3
Santa Inés	3
Santa Paula	3
Santa Ana	3
La Natividad	2
Las Petacas	2
Western Camps	2
Flores	1
La Victoria	1
San Carlos	1
Palomar	1
La Rinconada	1
Meadow Brook	1
Tortugas	1
Los Indios	1
Los Pingüinos	1
Coronel Suárez II	1
La Aguada	1

== Gallery ==
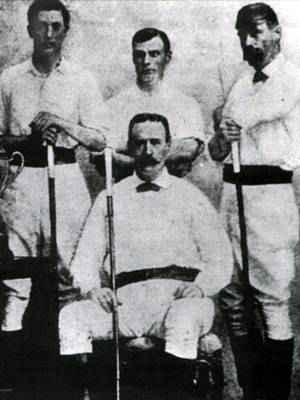
Hurlingham, the first winner in 1893

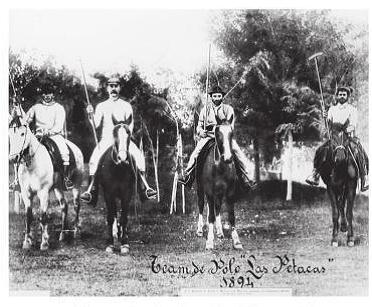
Las Petacas team of 1894. It would win the title in 1895 and 1896

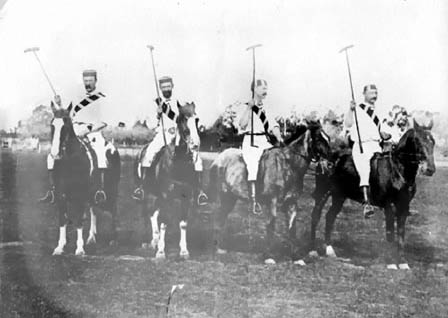
Flores, 1894 winners

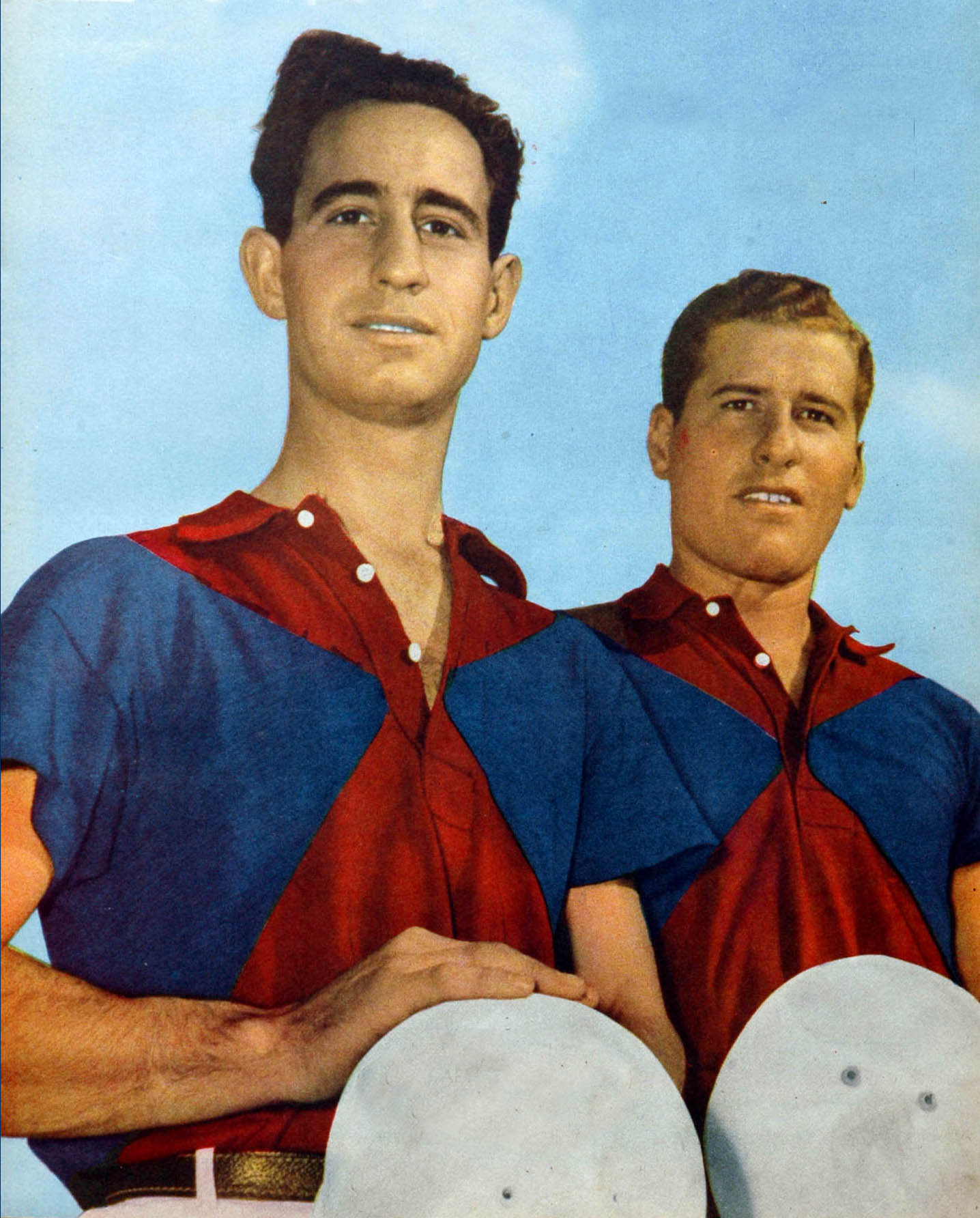
Horacio Heguy and Juan Carlos Harriott, winners with Coronel Suárez in 1958

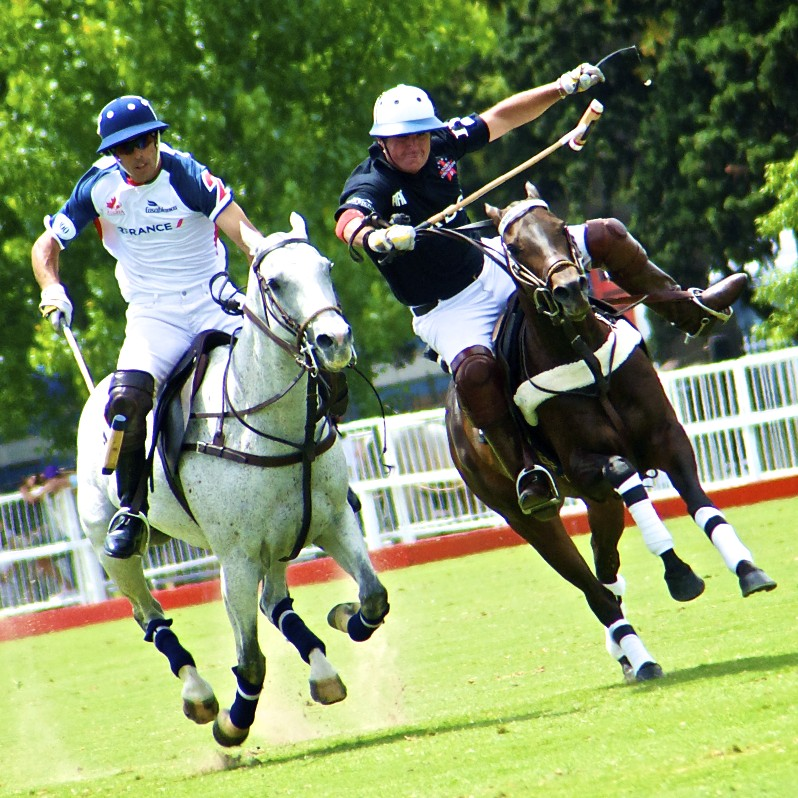
A match of the 2010 season
