= La Dolfina Polo Team =

Polo team in Argentina

La Dolfina
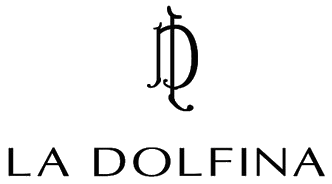
- Full name: La Dolfina Polo Team
- Sport: Polo
- Founded: 2000; 26 years ago
- Based in: Cañuelas, Buenos Aires Province
- Colors
- Captain: Adolfo Cambiaso
- Championships: List: Campeonato Argentino (10): 2002, 2005, 2006, 2007, 2009, 2011, 2013, 2014, 2015, 2016, 2017, 2018, 2019, 2020; Abierto de Hurlingham (9): 2000, 2001, 2002, 2006, 2011, 2012, 2013, 2014, 2015; Campeonato Abierto de Tortugas (4): 2013, 2014, 2015, 2016; Copa República Argentina (3): 2006, 2009, 2013; Copa Cámara de Diputados (1): 2006
- Website: ladolfina.com

La Dolfina (currently named La Dolfina Sancor Seguros due to sponsorship reasons) is an Argentine polo team, founded by Adolfo Cambiaso and Bartolomé Castagnola in 2000, based in the city of Cañuelas, Buenos Aires Province.

La Dolfina won the most important polo tournament in Argentina, the Abierto Argentino (Argentine Open) nine times: 2002, 2005, 2006, 2007, 2009, 2011, 2013, 2014, and 2015, becoming one of the most successful teams since its establishment in 2000. The team also won the Abierto de Hurlingham (considered the second in importance after Campeonato Argentino) in 2011 and 2012.

After the 2007 Argentine Open, the handicap of Lucas Monteverde was raised to 10, leaving La Dolfina as the only polo team with a perfect 10-goal handicap. For the 2008 Argentine Open, the expectations for winning the championship again were understandably high, but the team was beaten in the final match by Ellerstina (lined-up by Gonzalo Pieres, Facundo Pieres, Pablo Mac Donough, Juan Martin Nero) by 13–12 because of a golden goal by Gonzalo Pieres in an extra-chukka.

In 2013 La Dolfina won the Argentine Triple Crown of Polo which is considered the highest honor in the polo world, defeating Ellerstina in the finals of both Tortugas and Hurlingham Opens by scores of 16–14 and 18–16 respectively, then defeating Alegria by 16–11 in the most coveted Argentine Open Final at Palermo. In 2014 the team won again the Triple Crown, defeating Ellerstina in the three finals. With these victories, La Dolfina became the second team able to win the Triple Crown in two consecutive years, since Coronel Suárez (1974–1975).

== Members ==
N°	Player	Hand.	First Op.	Champ. Played	Champ. Won
1	(Argentina) Adolfo Cambiaso	10	1992	23	11
2	(Argentina) David Stirling	10	?	?	0
3	(Argentina) Adolfo Cambiaso Jr	10	2009	6	3
4	(Argentina) Juan Martin Nero	10	?	?	0

== Uniform ==
La Dolfina has changed its uniform many times along the years, most of them for sponsorship reasons. For the 2002 season the team made a great impact when wearing a jersey similar to football club Nueva Chicago. That was because Cambiaso and Bartolomé Castagnola decided to change the team colors due to its similarity with La Ellerstina's. Cambiaso, a football fan, chose the green and black because of his sympathy for Nueva Chicago although he is a River Plate fan. The green and black jersey made its debut in the inaugural match of the Campeonato Abierto Argentino on 24 November 2002.

For the 2002 Abierto Argentino final match, Cambiaso made the arrangements to move more than 200 Nueva Chicago football fans to the Campo Argentino de Polo, where they supported the team during the game against Indios Chapaleufú II on 15 November 2002. The fans gave a show never seen before in a polo match, displaying big flags, singing songs while playing drums and even throwing smoke bombs, as they usually did in a football match. The presence of the Nueva Chicago supporters in the final surprised the rest of the attendance, generating a big repercussion in the elitist environment of polo.

La Dolfina finally won the game by 20-16, with 16 goals by Cambiaso, achieving its first title ever.

2002	2005-09	2011	2012-today

== Titles ==
- Campeonato Argentino (14): 2002, 2005, 2006, 2007, 2009, 2011, 2013, 2014, 2015, 2016, 2017, 2018, 2019, 2020
- Abierto de Hurlingham (9): 2000, 2001, 2002, 2006, 2011, 2012, 2013, 2014, 2015
- Campeonato Abierto de Tortugas (6): 2013, 2014, 2015, 2016, 2017, 2018
- Copa República Argentina (3): 2006, 2009, 2013
- Copa Cámara de Diputados (1): 2006
- Abierto del Jockey Club (6): 1997, 2008, 2011, 2014, 2016, 2017
