= Hopwood (surname) =

Hopwood is a surname. Notable people with the surname include:

- Arthur Tindell Hopwood (1897-1969), British palaeontologist
- Avery Hopwood, American playwright
- David Hopwood, British geneticist
- John Hopwood, colonial-era settler of Western Pennsylvania
- John Hopwood, English cricketer
- Len Hopwood, English cricketer
- Mererid Hopwood, Welsh poet
- Ronald Arthur Hopwood (1868–1949), rear admiral, Royal Navy
- Shon Hopwood, American reformed bank robber and attorney
