= Lucas Monteverde =

Argentine polo player

- Born: December 18, 1976 (age 48); 25 de Mayo, Buenos Aires Province
- Occupation: Polo Player
- Spouse: Loly Lopez
- Children: Lucas (Jnr), Luna, Lucero

Lucas Monteverde (born December 18, 1976) is an Argentine professional polo player with a handicap of 9 (formerly 10). He grew up near the town of 25 de Mayo, Buenos Aires Province, at the estancia El Rincón. The ranch is run by his father Lucas, and uncle Marcelo Monteverde, one of the world's most successful coaches. He is married to the Argentine model Loli Lopez and has two children.

Monteverde has played polo since a very early age and turned professional with a 5-goal handicap travelling to Europe. Today, Monteverde, has grown into one of the world's finest defensive players, is well known for his outstanding work rate and horsemanship on the field. During his career, he played for teams including La Martina, Ellerstina & notably La Dolfina.

Monteverde's first Grand Slam win was at the 2005 Veuve Clicquot Cowdray Park Gold Cup, where he was called in as a late substitute for the injured Adolfo Cambiaso. With such a huge hole to fill, Monteverde led the team to victory with teammate Piki Alberdi over Black Bears. Other wins include the Hurlingham Open, the Gold Cup Deauville and the Gold Cup Sotogrande.

He played at the Campeonato Argentino Abierto de Polo (Argentine Open) for the first time in 2000. In 2005, 2006 and 2007 he won the Argentine Open with La Dolfina, led by Adolfo Cambiaso. In 2007, the team won because of a golden goal, shot in extratime by Monteverde. After the tournament, he was promoted to handicap 10, making La Dolfina the only polo team with a "perfect handicap" at the moment.
