= Gerald Barnard Balding Sr. =

British polo player

Gerald Matthews Balding (1903 – 16 September 1957) was a British champion polo player.

== Biography ==
He was born in Leicestershire, England, in 1903. He had two brothers who also played polo, Ivor Godfrey Balding and John Barnard "Barney" Balding. Gerald had four children, three boys and one girl. Two of his sons, Gerald Barnard "Toby" Balding and Ian Balding, were both thoroughbred racehorse trainers in Britain.

He remains the United Kingdom's last 10 goal polo player since 1939. Of the state of polo in England in the 1930s, he said, "Polo is not taken so seriously as in America or Argentina."

The Gerald Balding Cup is held annually at Cirencester Park Polo Club in his memory. In the 1920s he played in England, America and India. In 1930, 1936 and 1939, he played for England against the US for the Westchester Cup and was field captain of the English team in 1939. He was a brilliant striker of the ball and was rated as one of the finest players ever seen.

He died on 16 September 1957 in London, England.

His granddaughter is broadcaster and journalist Clare Balding.

== Publication ==
- Gerald Balding, "Polo as the English Play it," The Sportsman, September 1937, 36.

== See also ==
- List of significant families in British horse racing
