= Santa Fe-Coronda Marathon =

The Santa Fe–Coronda Marathon (formal name Coronda River Aquatic Marathon; in Spanish: Maratón Acuatíco Río Coronda) is a 59-kilometer open water swimming race that takes place on the Coronda and Salado rivers (both tributaries of the Paraná River) in Argentina. The race joins the cities of Santa Fe, Santo Tomé, Sauce Viejo, Desvío Arijón and Coronda, in Argentina's Santa Fe Province. The race has a total length of about 59 km and an expected run time of about 8 hours. It is held yearly in the summer (January or February).

The most recent edition of the race was held on Sunday, February 1, 2026; it was the 48th edition. The winner of this edition was Alessio Occhipinti, who also won the edition of 2025.

The first competition took place on 22 January 1961 under the name of "Fluvial Marathon of the Argentine Littoral". The marathon was not held, due to economic problems and/or varied political troubles, in 1968, 1969, 1971–1973, 1980–1986, and 1989. Since the 1990s (and as of 2006) it has been celebrated annually without interruption.

The race has been included as part of FINA's Marathon circuit (prior to 2007), and its appropriate successor: the FINA Open Water Grand Prix series.
