= Julian Hipwood =

British polo player and coach (born 1946)

Julian Hipwood (born 23 June 1946) is a British polo player and coach.

== Biography ==
He was born and raised in the Cotswolds, England. He started his career playing association football and gradually moved on to polo. Both Julian Hipwood in 1981 and his brother Howard Hipwood in 1982 achieved a 9-goal Polo handicap. Only 55 players worldwide have been rated 9-goal by the United States Polo Association.

He won the Barrantes Memorial Tournament and played on the winning team of many of Royal Palm Polo Club's 26-goal Sunshine League tournaments. In 1977–1978, he played with the Fort Lauderdale team, alongside captain Jack Oxley and players Jamie Uihlein, Bart Evans, Juan Bautista Castilla, Lito Salanito and Tom Harris. In 1978, he was a finalist in the Argentine Open, the first Englishman to do so. He played on the Southern Hills team that won the 1980 U.S. Open Polo Championship, but was sidelined due to an injury.

From 1981 to 1984, he won the 30-goal World Cup five time. In 1996, he won the United States Polo Association Monty Waterbury Cup and Heritage Cup. He was also the captain of the England National team winning the Coronation Cup six times, and the British Gold and Queen's Cups.

He later reconverted to a polo coach. He has coached the UK teams of George Mountbatten, 4th Marquess of Milford Haven and London-based French businessman Jérôme Wirth. He also coached the Coca-Cola team, which won the U.S. Open Championship in 2002.

He lives in the United States. He was inducted into the Museum of Polo and Hall of Fame on 12 February 2010.

His daughter Accalia Hipwood is a radio presenter that co-hosted the Radio 2 Breakfast show with Kenny & Accalia in Dubai.
