= Cartier Queen's Cup =

British polo tournament

The Cartier Queen's Cup is a 22-goal polo tournament at the Guards Polo Club in England. Named after Queen Elizabeth II, it is held annually in May–June. According to Country Life, it is the "jewel in the polo calendar" and it "encapsulates the best of the British season."

== Early life ==
The tournament was first established in 1960. Queen Elizabeth II, the namesake of the tournament, gave out the first silver cup in 1960. She repeatedly attended the finals and regularly gave out the silver cup.

Members of the British royal family have competed in the tournament. For example, Prince Philip, Duke of Edinburgh competed and lost in 1964 and 1966. Meanwhile, Charles, Prince of Wales's team, Les Diables Bleus, won in 1986.

Polo champion Adolfo Cambiaso won the cup ten times.
