= Hurlingham Club (Argentina) =

Argentine sports and social club

Coordinates: 34.587447°S 58.63031°W

Hurlingham
- Full name: Hurlingham Club
- Sports: Current: Polo; Golf; Cricket; Tennis; Squash; Riding horse; Former: Association football (Note: A football team of Hurlingham registered to play the first Argentine Primera División championship in 1891, but the squad finally withdrew. It is unclear when the sport was left behind by the club.); Horse racing (until 1910); Rugby union (Note: There are records of –at least– four friendly matches played by a rugby team of Hurlingham in 1894.)
- Founded: 22 November 1888; 137 years ago
- Based in: Hurlingham, Buenos Aires
- Stadium: Hurlingham Club Ground (cricket)
- Colors
- Chairman: Martin Heller
- Manager: Fernando Kelly
- Website: hurlinghamclub.com.ar

Hurlingham Club is an Argentine sports and social club located in the city of Hurlingham, Buenos Aires. It is named after the Hurlingham Club in London and was set up in 1888 by the local Anglo-Argentine community. The town of Hurlingham and Hurlingham Partido grew up around the club, taking its name.

The club hosts a wide range of activities, such as cricket, gymnastics, golf, horse riding, polo, squash, and tennis. The "Abierto de Hurlingham" (Hurlingham Open) polo tournament is considered the 2nd. in importance after the Campeonato Argentino.

The club covers 73 hectares and has an 18-hole golf course, five polo fields, stables for 300 horses, schools of polo, horse riding and pony riding, 18 tennis courts including six grass courts, a cricket pitch, two swimming pools, three paddle tennis courts and an indoor complex with a gym, squash court and dressing rooms.

The club house also has function rooms, restaurant and bars, plus hotel rooms available to members.

Hurlingham was the first place in Argentina where polo was played, and the Argentine Polo Association was founded at the club in 1922. Argentina has subsequently become a dominant power in international polo, and the club hosts a major polo tournament each year, the "Campeonato Abierto de Hurlingham".

== History ==
At the end of the 19th century there were very few institutions where one could practise sports in Buenos Aires. Due to the construction of the railway lines in Argentina, many British citizen had established in Argentina, forming a big community that founded social and sports clubs where British sports could be practised, such as bowls, cricket, football, golf, horse riding, rugby union and tennis amongst others.

John Ravenscroft, an Englishman living in the rural village of Puan, Buenos Aires, wanted to join the British community of Argentina to practise all the sports in a same place. He was inspired by the London Hurlingham Club that ruled polo worldwide to create a similar institution in Argentina. In 1886 he tried to get support from Buenos Aires Cricket Club, but it was denied.

In 1888 Ravenscroft got the funds and called a meeting, attended by John Campbell, John Drysdale, John Ravenscroft, John Drysdale (nephew), Hugh Scott Robson, B.W. Gardom, David Methven, Edward Casey, Alexander Hume y David Bankier, who wrote the statute of "Sociedad Anónima Hurlingham Club". The statute was later sent to the Government for its approval, which was given by then President of Argentina Miguel Juárez Celman on 22 November 1888.

Ravenscroft wished to have the club located in the district of Belgrano, Buenos Aires, but the owners of the available lands increased their costs considerably enough to dismiss the idea. Other neighborhoods where the recently formed club tried to place were Flores, Chacarita, Villa Devoto (all of them in the city of Buenos Aires) even trying Vicente López Partido in Greater Buenos Aires, with no successful results. The final solution came from Mr. Hill, then General Manager of the Buenos Aires and Pacific Railway and a cricket enthusiast, who promised to help the club to find a land where to establish its headquarters and fields.

The club was finally located in a land placed next to the Pacific railway tracks. The only way to access the club was on horseback, due to there were no pavement roads by then in Buenos Aires. During the first years of existence of the club, the members coming to Hurlingham by train, asked the motorman to stop in front of the club to up and down passengers. Hurlingham railway station would be built some years later, although train drivers used to stop at Hurlingham to pick up the passengers.

The grounds may be seen from the railway and rural tramway, well fenced in with wire net fence and the buildings are rising rapidly. The lodge is being roofed and the racquets court and fives court are already advancing to a state of completion, while the pavilion accommodation, brick building and the stables are being commenced…

— The Standard newspaper, 29 May 1889

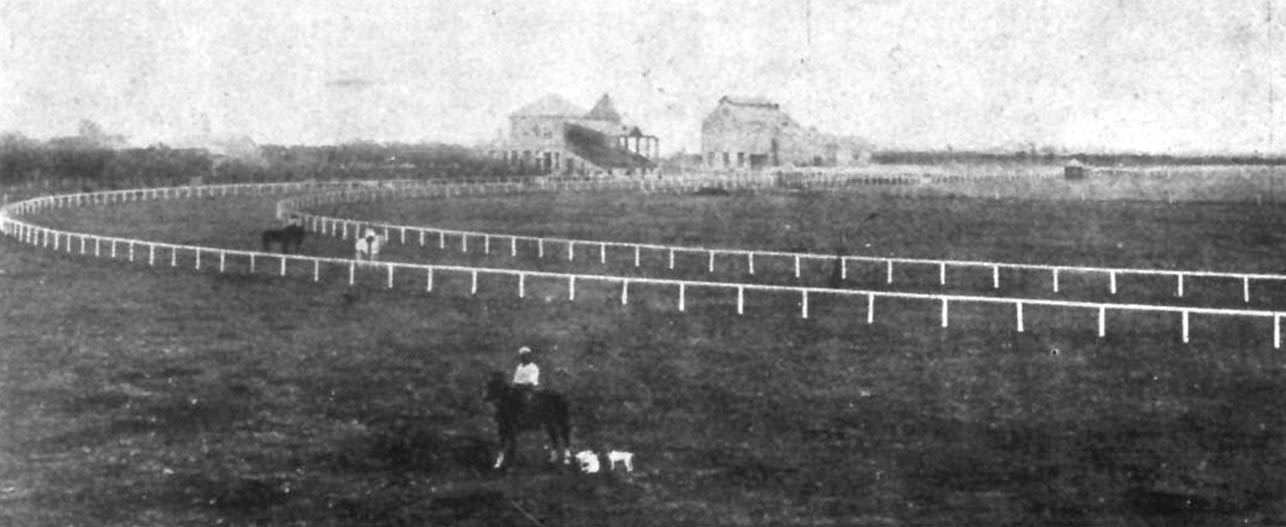
Hurlingham had the first race track of Argentina

William Lacey, a professional cricketer, was instrumental in the construction of the Club (and what would later be the village of Hurlingham). Under his direction, the club was fenced, a cricket pitch prepared, and the first trees planted. In 1889, the first race track of Argentina was built at Hurlingham Club. At the end of 1889 the club sent Pacific Railway a request to build a station close to the club. The railway company satisfied the demand and the "Hurlingham" (taking the name of the club) station was opened in 1890, with a daily service to Palermo.

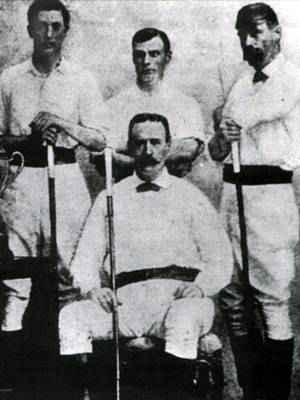
Hurlingham polo team of 1893

On 6 January 1890 the first cricket match was held in Hurlingham Club, against Buenos Aires Cricket Club. The match was supported by the BAPR, even providing a special sleeping coach for the players, who travelled the night before the game. The first polo ground was inaugurated on May 16, 1890.

There are also records of a rugby match played at Hurligham vs the Buenos Aires Football Club in June 1890, and another match between both clubs played six years later, with cricketer William Lacey taking part of it. Also in June, football was played for the first time at the club, when Buenos Aires beat Montevideo CC.

Hurlingham registered with the Argentine Association Football League (the first body to organise a football championship in the country) to play the first Primera División championship held in 1891, but withdrew before the tournament started, The Hurlingham team was retired by Ravenscroft in solidarity with Alexander Watson Hutton (who had resigned as director of St. Andrew's School after they refused to include the practise of football, so Alex Lamont did not call him to be part of the league).

In June 1892 the first golf tournament was played at Hurlingham. One year later it was played, the first game of which is considered the oldest championship in the world, the Campeonato Abierto de Hurlingham. From 1904 to 1910, the Jockey Club paid a subsidy to Hurlingham to assist with the racing activity. In 1910 the club suspended horse racing definitely, due to a law promulgated by the National Government of Argentina forbidding the races on weekdays.

== Honours ==
=== Cricket ===
- Primera División (14):

1900-01, 1903-04, 1912-13, 1913-14, 1920-21, 1921-22, 1934-35, 1982-83, 1985-86, 1986-87, 1987-88, 1993-94, 1996-97, 2007-08

=== Polo ===
- Abierto Argentino (15): 1893 (Apr), 1893 (Oct), 1897, 1899, 1902, 1903, 1905, 1918, 1920, 1921, 1925, 1926, 1927, 1929, 1937

== See also ==
- Hurlingham Club Ground
- Campeonato Abierto de Hurlingham
