= Adolfo Cambiaso =

Argentine polo player (born 1975)

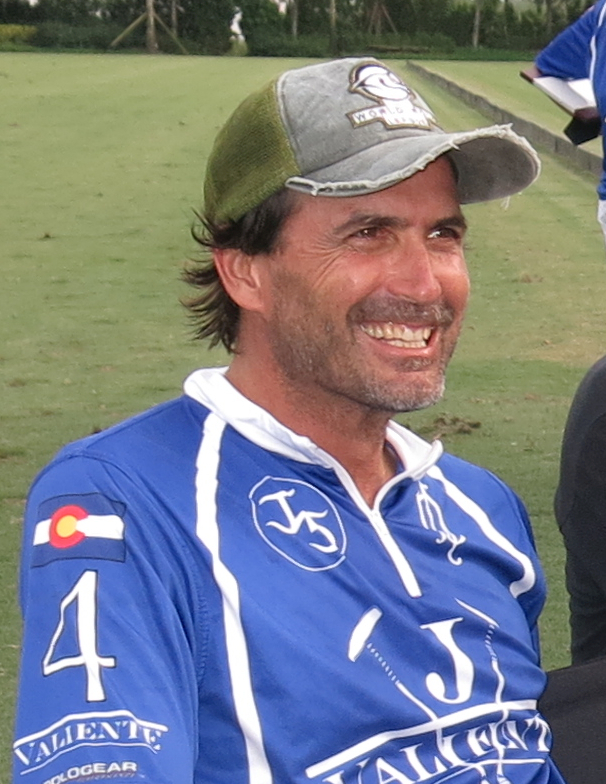
- Cambiaso in 2019

Personal information
- Nickname: Dolfi
- Born: 15 April 1975 (age 51) Cañuelas, Argentina
- Website: www.ladolfina.com

Sport
- Sport: Polo
- Rank: One (10-goal handicap)
- Team: La Dolfina Polo Team

Achievements and titles
- World finals: Abierto de Polo with La Ellerstina: 1994, 1997, 1998 with La Dolfina: 2002, 2005, 2006, 2007, 2009, 2011, 2013, 2014, 2015, 2016.
- Highest world ranking: 2

Adolfo Cambiaso (born 15 April 1975) is an Argentine professional polo player with a 10-goal handicap rating.

== Early years ==
From an early age his mother, Martina de Estrada Lainez, encouraged her son Adolfo and his half brothers to play polo. By age 12 he had a 1-goal handicap, and a year later, with a 3-goal rating, he won the Eduardo Heguy Cup with team La Martina, playing with his father (also Adolfo). In 1989, at age 14 and with the San Diego team, he won the Campaña del Desierto Cup, and a year later the Renault Cup Open with La Martina, gaining a 6-goal handicap.

== Professional career ==
=== 1990 to 1994 ===
Cambiaso traveled abroad regularly, winning 24 tournaments in Argentina, England and the US, while playing for teams like La Martina, Ellerstina/Ellerston White and others. In 1994 he won the "Triple Corona" (Argentine Open, Hurlingham Open, Tortugas Open) with Ellerstina, and his handicap rating was raised to 10-goals, the youngest player to attain this.

=== 1995 to 1999 ===
He won 31 tournaments with teams like La Martina, Ellerstina/Ellerston White, White Birch and Outback.

His awards included the Olimpia de Plata award as the most important Argentine polo player of 1997, and the best player at the final of the Abierto Argentino 1997, with a record 67 goals in the 1998 Abierto Argentino.

=== 2000 ===
In this period Cambiaso took home 33 trophies. He left Ellerstina, and became successful with his own team, La Dolfina, which he co-founded with Bartolomé Castagnola, and won the Campeonato Argentino Abierto de Polo (Argentine Open) in 2002. In England he started playing for the Dubai team, and won the Cartier Queen's Cup three times and the Gold Cup seven (including for other teams), among other tournaments.

=== 2005 to 2008 ===
Cambiaso's La Dolfina team continued to dominate, winning the Argentine Open in 2005, 2006 and 2007. They defeated Ellerstina by 20–19 in 2005, the highest score in an Argentine Open final match. He continued playing successfully for Dubai in England, but also became captain for team Crab Orchard in the US, winning the US Open and the USPA Gold Cup. 2008 was a less successful year, not winning one match in the English polo season, nor any of the prestigious Argentine tournaments. La Dolfina made it to the finals of the Argentine Open, but was beaten by Ellerstina 12-13 after a golden goal by Gonzalo Pieres in an extra time.

=== Current ===
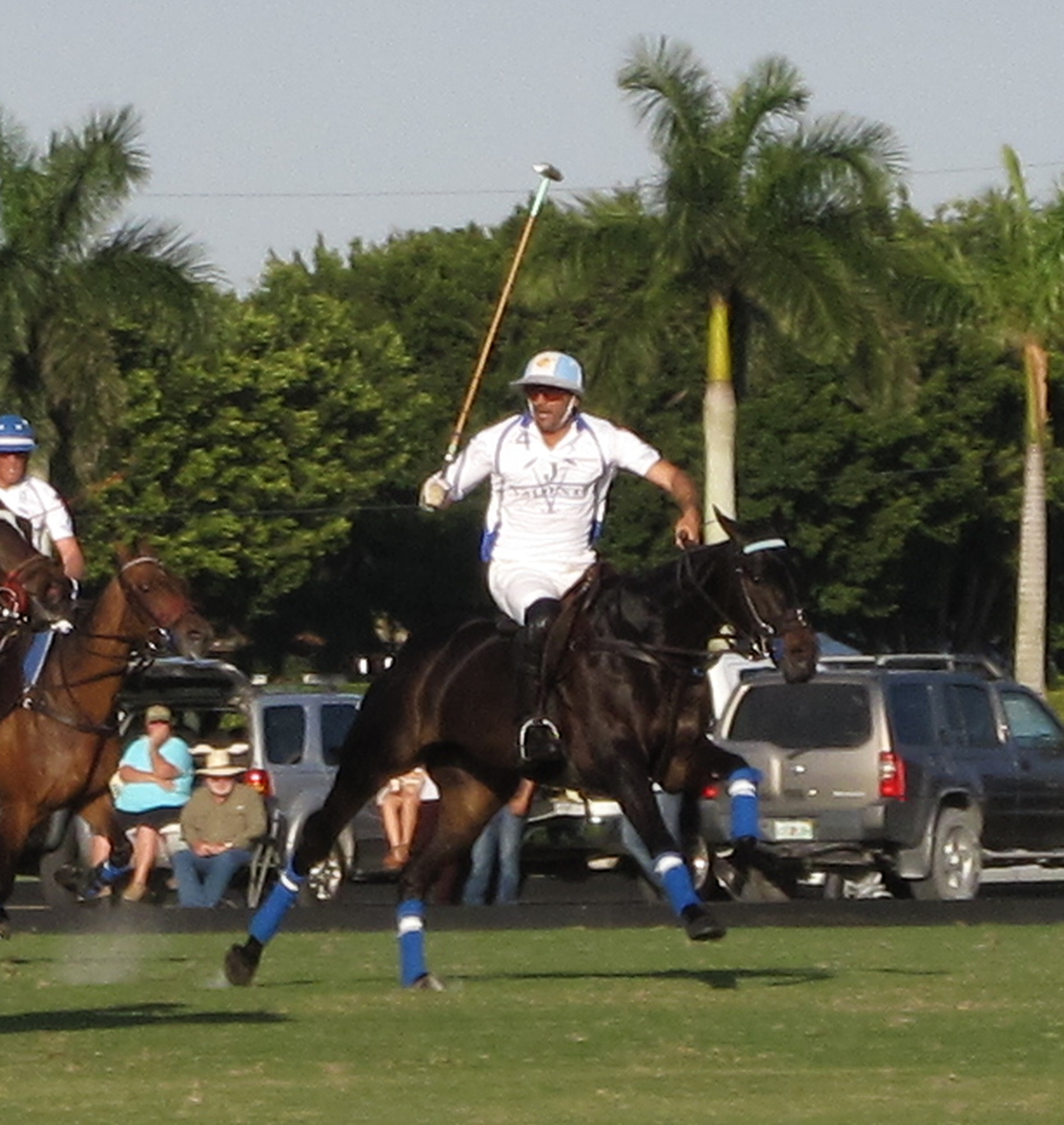
Cambiaso at the International Polo Club, 2016, wearing his distinctive helmet colors of Argentina

Today, he is considered the best player in the world and the most successful player in the Argentine Open, competing 15 times and winning 7, and played in the final another 2 times. He scored 535 goals in the Argentine Open alone, breaking the record held by Bautista Heguy with 531 goals. He played for the Argentina national team since 2002 when they won the Copa Quilmes.

== Horses ==
Of his horses, the most notable were Lili, Ilusión, Sospechosa, La Osa, and his favourite Colibrí. His most recognized horses included Mambo, Bruma and Dolfina Cuartetera. For the 2015 U.S. Open, his best horses were the mare Romana and the stallion Boeing, known as the "American Pharoah" of the polo world.

=== Cloning ===
At age 25 Cambiaso decided to create his own breeding business from scratch, as well as the polo team La Dolfina. Today he has nearly 1000 horses on his extensive farms.

One of his best polo ponies was a world-famous stallion, Aiken Cura. The horse was seriously injured during the final of the 2006 Argentine Open, and suffered further setbacks in treatment of the broken bone in his near foreleg. The injury occurred in the extra chukka, and the horse was taken off in the horse ambulance, forcing Cura's early retirement from the field. After amputation a prosthesis was fitted, but due to complications Aiken Cura had to be euthanized in January 2007, but not before live skin cells were harvested at Cambiaso's request in the event cloning became possible.

Cambiaso pioneered the horse cloning business. He was approached by polo enthusiast Texan Alan Meeker of Crestview Genetics. Meeker teamed up with Cambiaso, and in 2010 produced that first clone. Together with biologist Dr. Adrian Mutto and Argentine tycoon Ernesto Gutiérrez he proceeded to clone his favorite 17-year-old mare Cuartetera, multiple times, clones of which he rode to win the 2017 Argentine Open.

A clone of his horse Cuartetera was bought for $800,000 at an auction, making it the most expensive horse sale in polo history. This horse was kept by contract within the partnership. No clones are now sold, only their foals.

== Personal life ==
In 2001 Cambiaso married former model and Argentine television presenter María Vázquez. He has three children: Mia (born 2002), Adolfo Jr (born 2005)—who was born during the Argentine Polo Open in the middle of a qualifier against Centauros-Beaufort, which his father left half-way through in order to be present at the birth—and Myla (born 2010).

== Awards and recognition ==
He won the Platinum Konex Award in 2000 and 2010 as the best poloist of each decade in Argentina. On 24 June 2012, Queen Elizabeth II presented Cambiaso with an award commending his pioneering efforts to encourage violence-free training in a country where breaking a horse used to involve pain and distress, as recommended by pioneer horse trainer Monty Roberts.

Awards
Preceded by Sergio Martínez	Olimpia de Oro; 2014	Succeeded by Paula Pareto
