= Campeonato Abierto de Hurlingham =

Polo competition held in Argentina

Hurlingham Open
- Most recent season or competition: 2013
- Sport: Polo
- Founded: April 1, 1893; 133 years ago
- Motto: "The Oldest"
- No. of teams: 8
- Country: Argentina
- Venue: Hurlingham Club
- Broadcaster: ESPN
- Website: http://www.hurlingham-club.com.ar

The Hurlingham Open (Spanish: Campeonato Abierto de Hurlingham) is a yearly polo competition that takes place at the Hurlingham Club, Argentina.
