= George Denholm Armour =

British painter

George Denholm Armour OBE
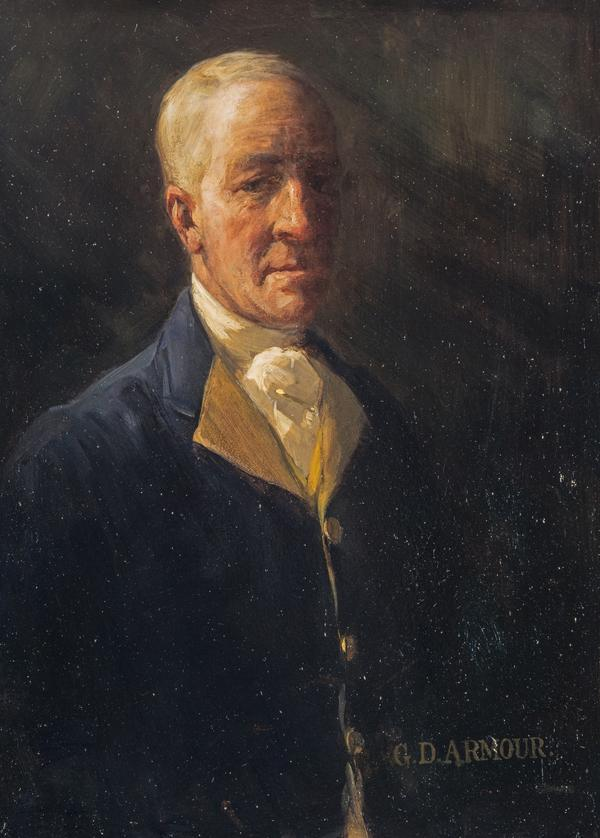
- Born: 30 January 1864; Carmunnock, Lanarkshire, Scotland
- Died: 17 February 1949 (aged 85); Swindon, Wiltshire, England
- Occupations: Painter, illustrator, author
- Spouse: Mary Emma Taylor Robb (1864–1925); Violet Burton

George Denholm Armour OBE (1864–1949) was a British painter and illustrator. During his career he made hundreds of illustrations for The Graphic, Punch and Country Life, most connected with horses and riding. His work was part of the art competitions at the 1928 Summer Olympics, the 1932 Summer Olympics, and the 1948 Summer Olympics.

== Early life ==
George Denholm Armour was born in Waterside or Carmunnock, Lanarkshire, Scotland on 30 January 1864, to parents Robert Armour and Marion Paterson, and had several brothers and sisters. He grew up in Liverpool and went to school in Fife. He graduated from the University of St Andrews and the Edinburgh College of Art.

== Career ==
He moved to Tangiers, Morocco, to paint and buy horses. When his money ran out, he moved to London and shared a studio with Phil May. He met Joseph Crawhall III on a hunting and painting holiday, and they both ran a stud farmhouse in Wheathampstead, Hertfordshire, England.

During the early 1890s Armour had space at 6 North Charlotte Street, Edinburgh, while residing at nearby 7A Frederick Street. For a short period of time he shared the North Charlotte address with writer to the Signet, Adam West Gifford.

In 1898, he married Mary Emma Taylor Robb (1864–1925), and Crawhall was his best man at the wedding. They had one son, Robert. He did illustrations for The Graphic, Punch and Country Life. By 1903 they had moved into Etchilhampton House, Wiltshire.

In 1910, he studied military equestrianism at the Spanish Riding School in Vienna, Austria. In 1913, he became an honorary member of the Meadowbrook Polo Club.

During the First World War, he commanded the remount depot in 1914/1915 at Purton Stoke, Wiltshire, before commanding the depot at Salonika from 1917 to 1919. It was Armour who requisitioned a transfer of old friend, former Australian jackaroo and Scottish poet, Will H. Ogilvie to assist at Purton Stoke. As temporary major, he was awarded the Greek Medal for Military Merit, 3rd Class, as well as an Order of the British Empire, 'For services rendered in connection with military operations in the Balkans'. He retired from the British Army on 22 February 1922 at the rank of lieutenant colonel.

By 1920, Armour was living at 'Parkside', a Grade II* listed building in Corsham, west Wiltshire; while being a member of the Savage Club in London. When his wife Mary died in June 1925, he married Violet Burton in September 1926. They lived in Malmesbury. By 1927, they were living at Easton House, one mile east of Corsham. He became a member of the Royal Scottish Academy.

He died at Liddington Manor, Swindon, Wiltshire on 17 February 1949.

== Works ==
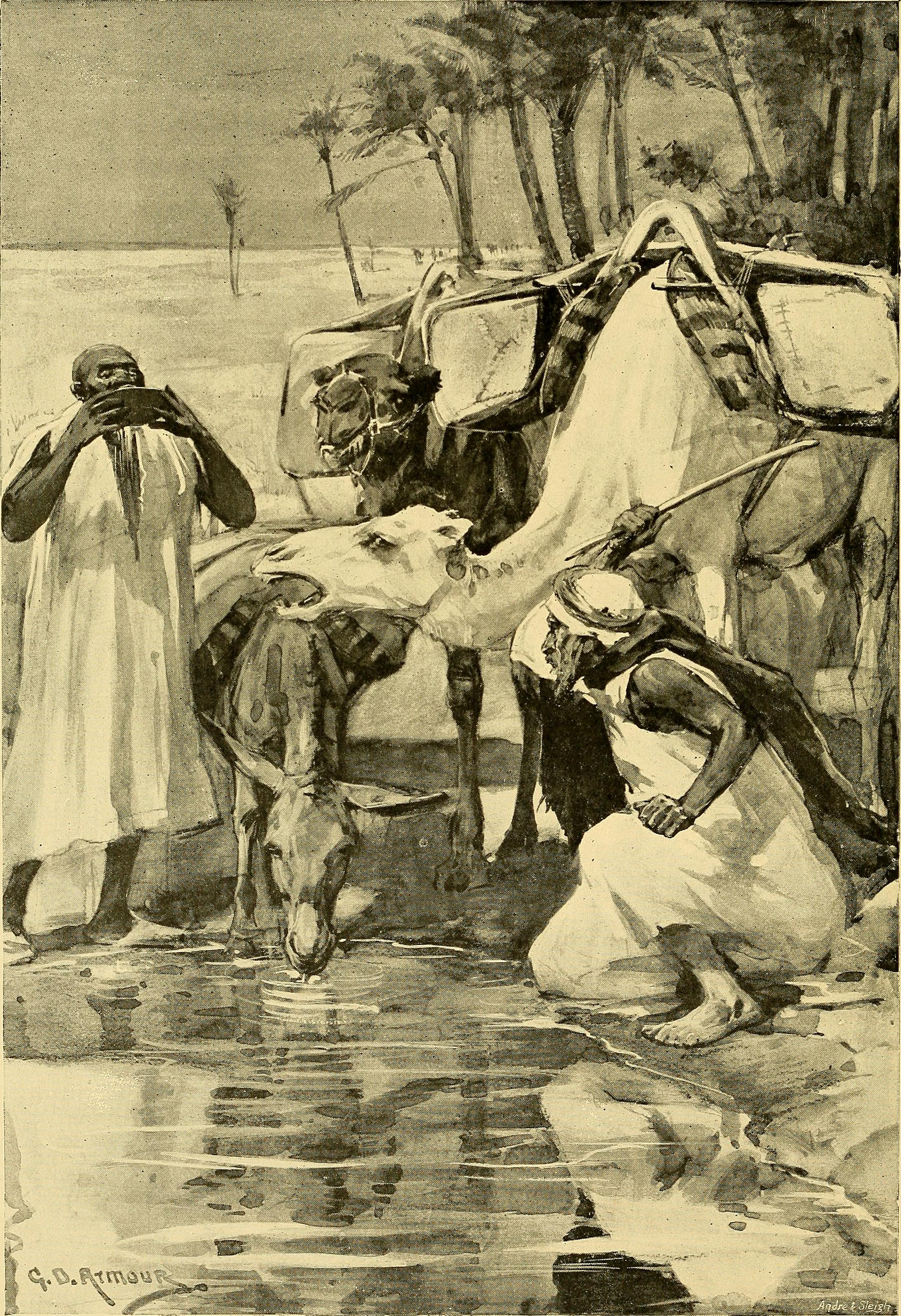
Caravan at a well in the desert, by G. D. Armour

Some of his paintings are owned by the City of Glasgow, the National Trust, the Aberdeen Art Gallery, the National Galleries of Scotland and the University of Edinburgh. His painting, A Polo Match, was sold at Christie's in 1988.

=== Books ===
- Pastime with good company (1914), Country Life publisher, 55 reproductions. Reprinted 1930.
- Bridle & Brush – Reminiscences of an Artist Sportsman (1937, republished 1986), Ashford Press Publishing, 384 pages, 127 drawings and four colour plates by Armour; an autobiography.
- Horse laughter (1938), a series of anecdotes and stories, co-authored with Will H. Ogilvie, illustrated by Armour, 87 pages, published by Duckworth, London.

=== Illustrator ===
- Thomas Scott Anderson's Hound and horn in Jedforest: Being some experiences of a Scottish M.F.H. (1909). Scott Anderson's daughter married Will H. Ogilvie.
- R. S. Surtees's Handley Cross (1910), Hodder and Stoughton publishers, with 'a large number of spirited watercolour drawings'.
- Edward Dirom Cuming's With rod and gun (1912) of shooting and fishing.
- Edward Dirom Cuming's Coaching days and ways (The British Sport Series) (1913), Hodder and Stoughton, about horse-drawn coach transport.

=== Paintings ===
- Two Huntsmen on Horseback, One Blowing a Horn
- Miss Esme Jenner (1896/1897-1932), as Master of the Sparkford Vale Harriers
- The Sound of the Horn, Twilight and Dimsey
- Mater pulchra, filia pulchrior: Twilight and Dimsey
- On the Staircase
- George Denholm Armour, Artist, Self-Portrait
- Upper Half of Male Nude
- Study of Reclining Female Nude and Bearded Male
- D. Milburn (U.S. back), polo player
- A Nearside Shot by Leslie Cheape, polo player
- Larry Waterbury Scoring, polo player
- Capt. Ritson Making a Run, polo player
- Saving a Goal
- Mounted Polo Player
- A Polo Match
- A Faithful Hunter
- Portrait of a Hunter
