= International Polo Cup =

International competition in polo

- Sport: Polo
- Awarded for: Head-to-head competition
- Country: England, United States

History
- First award: 1886; 140 years ago
- Editions: 20
- First winner: England (1886)
- Most wins: United States (12)
- Most recent: England (2023)

The International Polo Cup, also called the Newport Cup and the Westchester Cup, is a trophy in polo that was created in 1886 and is played for by teams from the United States and England. (Note: The England team is allowed to include one player not from England but from the Commonwealth of Nations.) Matches were conducted 12 times between 1886 and 1939, suspended during World War II, and not revived until 1992 due to changing times and interests. Originally contested as a best-of-three series, single-game matches have been held since the event was revived. The most recent match was held in March 2023 at the National Polo Center in Wellington, Florida, won by the English team.

== History ==
The history of the cup dates to 1886. The cup was purchased by a subscription and presented to the Westchester Polo Club, from which its original name originates, in 1886. It was won in 1886 and 1902 by English teams from the Hurlingham Club.

In 1909, Americans Monte Waterbury, Lawrence Waterbury, Harry Payne Whitney and Devereux Milburn formed a team, dubbed the Big Four, that won the cup. The same team was successful in 1911 and 1913, but lost the cup to England in 1914.

In the 1920s and 1930s, the Westchester Cup was the most anticipated event on the sporting calendar in the United States.

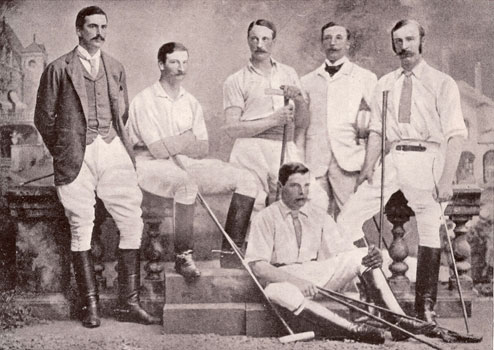
1886 English team

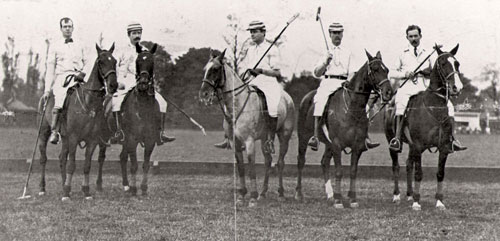
1902 American team

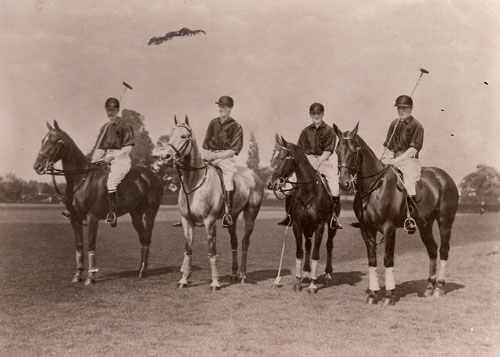
1909 English team

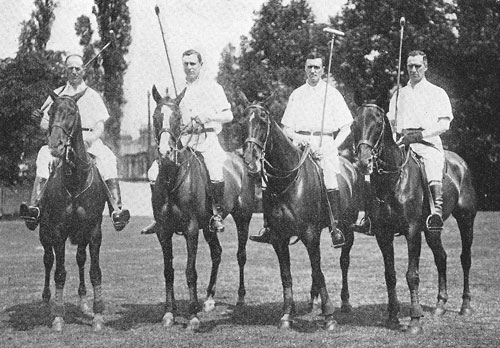
1921 American team

== Match results ==
The below table lists the results of each match, and the overall series record between the two teams. The match was suspended in the 1940s due to World War II and was not revived until the 1990s.

Year	Winner	Series	English team	American team	Score	Venue (date)	Ref.
1886	ENG	ENG, 1–0	Thomas Hone, Richard Lawley, Malcolm Orme Little and Capt.John Henry Watson	William Knapp Thorn, Raymond Rodgers Belmont, Foxhall Parker Keene and Thomas Hitchcock, Sr.	10–4; 14–2	Newport	
1902	ENG	ENG, 2–0	Cecil Patteson Nickalls, Patteson Womersley Nickalls, Frederick Maitland Freake, Walter Selby Buckmaster, George Arthur Miller and Charles Darley Miller	Rodolphe Louis Agassiz, James Montaudevert Waterbury Jr., John Elliott Cowdin, Lawrence Waterbury and Foxhall Parker Keene	1–2; 6–1; 7–1	Hurlingham (May 31–June 21)	
1909	USA	ENG, 2–1	Herbert Haydon Wilson, Harry Rich, Frederick Maitland Freake, Patteson Womersley Nickalls, John Wodehouse, 3rd Earl of Kimberley and John Hardress Lloyd	Lawrence Waterbury, James Montaudevert Waterbury Jr., Harry Payne Whitney and Devereaux Milburn	9–5; 8–2	Hurlingham (June 23, July 5)	
1911	USA	TIE, 2–2	Leslie St. Clair Cheape, Arthur Noel Edwards, John Hardress Lloyd and Herbert Haydon Wilson with Arthur Noel Edwards as the alternate.	Lawrence Waterbury, James Montaudevert Waterbury Jr., Harry Payne Whitney and Devereaux Milburn	4.5–3; 4.5–3.5	Meadow Brook (June 1, June 9)	
1913	USA	USA, 3–2	Leslie St. Clair Cheape, Ralph Gerald Ritson and Vivian Noverre Lockett.	Lawrence Waterbury, Louis Ezekiel Stoddard, James Montaudevert Waterbury Jr., Harry Payne Whitney and Devereaux Milburn	5.5–3; 4.5–4.25	Meadow Brook (June 10, June 14)	
1914	ENG	TIE, 3–3	Henry Archdale Tomkinson, Leslie St. Clair Cheape, Frederick W. Barrett and Vivian Noverre Lockett	Rene Morgan La Montagne Jr., James Montaudevert Waterbury Jr., Devereaux Milburn and Lawrence Waterbury	8.5–3; 4–2.75	Meadow Brook (June 15)	
1921	USA	USA, 4–3	Henry Archdale Tomkinson, Frederick W. Barrett, Lord Wodehouse and Vivian Noverre Lockett	Louis Ezekiel Stoddard, Thomas Hitchcock Jr., James Watson Webb, Sr. and Devereaux Milburn	16–5; 14–5	Hurlingham	
1924	USA	USA, 5–3	Thomas William Kirkwood, Teignmouth Philip Melvill, Frank Brereton Hurndall, Geoffrey H. Phipps-Hornby, Sr., Eric Garnett Atkinson and Lewis Lawrence Lacey	James Watson Webb, Sr., Thomas Hitchcock Jr., Malcolm Stevenson, Robert Early Strawbridge Jr. and Devereaux Milburn	16–5; 14–5	Meadow Brook	
1927	USA	USA, 6–3	Claude Ernest Pert, Richard George, Austin Henry Williams, John Pitt Dening, Charles Thomas Irvine Roark and Eric Garnett Atkinson	James Watson Webb, Sr., Thomas Hitchcock Jr., Malcolm Stevenson and Devereaux Milburn	13–3; 8–5	Meadow Brook	
1930	USA	USA, 7–3	Gerald Barnard Balding, Sr., Lewis Lawrence Lacey, Charles Thomas Irvine Roark and Humphrey Patrick Guinness.	Eric Leader Pedley, Earle Hopping, Thomas Hitchcock Jr. and Winston Frederick Churchill Guest	10–5; 14–9	Meadow Brook (September 15)	
1936	USA	USA, 8–3	Hugh Hesketh Hughes, Gerald Barnard Balding, Sr., Eric Horace Tyrrell-Martin and Humphrey Patrick Guinness.	Eric Leader Pedley, Michael Grace Phipps, Stewart Birrell Iglehart and Winston Frederick Churchill Guest.	10–9; 8–6	Hurlingham	
1939	USA	USA, 9–3	Robert Skene, Aiden Roark, Gerald Barnard Balding, Sr. and Eric Horace Tyrrell-Martin	Michael Grace Phipps, Thomas Hitchcock Jr., Stewart Birrell Iglehart and Winston Frederick Churchill Guest	11–7; 9–4	Meadow Brook	
Revival
1992	USA	USA, 10–3	William Lucas, Cody Forsyth, Alan Kent, Howard Hipwood	John Gobin, Adam Snow, Owen Rinehart, Robert E. Walton	8–7	Guards (July 26)	
1997	ENG	USA, 10–4	William Lucas, Cody Forsyth, Howard Hipwood, Andrew Hine	Julio Arellano, Michael Azzaro, Guillermo Gracida Jr., John B. Goodman	12–9	Guards (July 27)	
2009	ENG	USA, 10–5	Luke Tomlinson, Mark Tomlinson, James Beim, Eduardo Novillo Astrada	Adam Snow, Mike Azzaro, Nic Roldan, Jeff Blake, Jeff Hall	10–9	International (February 21)	
2012	ENG	USA, 10–6			11–10.5	Guards	
2012	USA	USA, 11–6		Nic Roldan, Marc Ganzi, Jeff Hall, Carlos Gracida Jr.	8.5–6	Grand Champions (November 25)	
2013	ENG	USA, 11–7	Luke Tomlinson, James Beim, Mark Tomlinson and John Paul Clarkin	Marc Ganzi, Polito Pieres, Nic Roldan, Mike Azzaro, Jeff Blake	12–11	Guards (July 28)	
2019	USA	USA, 12–7 (Note: Overall record per the United States Polo Association.)	Henry Porter, Ollie Cudmore, Jack Richardson, Tommy Beresford	Jared Zenni, Mike Azzaro, Peke Gonzalez, Geronimo Obregon	9–8	International (April 28)	
2023	ENG	USA, 12–8	James Beim, Max Charlton, Mark Tomlinson, Tomas Beresford	Matt Coppola, Nicolas Escobar, Jeff Hall, Jared Zenni	12–9	National Polo Center (March 31) (Note: National Polo Center is the facility previously known as International Polo Club Palm Beach.)	
