= Waterbury (disambiguation) =

Waterbury is a city in Connecticut, United States.

Waterbury may also refer to:

== Places in the United States ==
- Waterbury, Connecticut, a city
- Waterbury, Florida, an unincorporated area in Manatee County
- Waterbury, Nebraska, a village
- Waterbury, Vermont, a town
  - Waterbury (village), Vermont, a village within the town
- Waterbury, Wisconsin, an unincorporated community

== People ==
- Alexandra Waterbury, American ballet dancer and model
- James Montaudevert Waterbury, Sr. (1851-1931), American businessman and industrialist
- James Montaudevert Waterbury, Jr. (1876–1920), American polo player
- John Waterbury, American academic
- Lawrence Waterbury (1877–1943), American polo player
- Nelson J. Waterbury (1819-1894), American lawyer

== Fiction ==
- The Waterbury family, the subject of E. Nesbit's novel The Railway Children
- A fictional place in the television series Slasher

== Other uses ==
- SS Waterbury, a United States Shipping Board cargo ship
- Waterbury Clock Company, now part of Timex Group USA
