= Tianjin Goldin Metropolitan Polo Club =

Polo club in Tianjin, China

The Tianjin Goldin Metropolitan Polo Club is a polo club in Tianjin, China.

== Overview ==
It was funded by Goldin Properties Holdings owned by Pan Sutong, a property magnate. It is home to more than 200 ponies from Australasia and Europe. Prospective members need to be invited by the Board of Advisors, and the club is only open to its members and their guests.

== Tournaments ==
The club has hosted 16-goal international tournaments. It has organized chukkers with the Federation of International Polo and the Chinese State General Administration of Sports. Argentine player Pablo Jauretche and Australian Glen Gilmore have played there. It has also hosted the Snow Polo World Cup, which was shown live on TVB.

From October 1 to October 5, 2013, it hosted the Super Nations Cup. On October 1, the English team beat the USA team 14–13. The following day, on October 2, the Hong Kong, China team won 10–9 against the Argentine team. In the Round Subsidiary final on October 4, the USA team (Mike Azzaro, Nic Roldan, Tomas Collingwood and Ulysses Escapite) won 13–8 against the Argentine team (Martin Pepa, Mariano Obregon, Michel Dorignac and Martin Donovan). In the final match on October 5, the Hong Kong China team (John-Paul Clarkin, John-Paul Ganon and Dirk Gould) won 11–7 against the English team (Luke Tomlinson, Mark Tomlinson, Nacho Gonzalez and Henry Fisher).

== Goldin Financial Holdings Bankcruptcy ==
Goldin has been declared bankrupt in 2022. The hotel has been abandoned for years and is in a deteriorating condition.

In a letter to mayor Zhang Gong in January 2025, German project developer TSPC offered to take over the Hotel. TS Prototype-Creation detailed a concept to convert the hotel into a free university, possibly just until current legal cases over the bankruptcy of Goldin Group are settled and a new investor is found.
