= Louis Ezekiel Stoddard =

American polo player

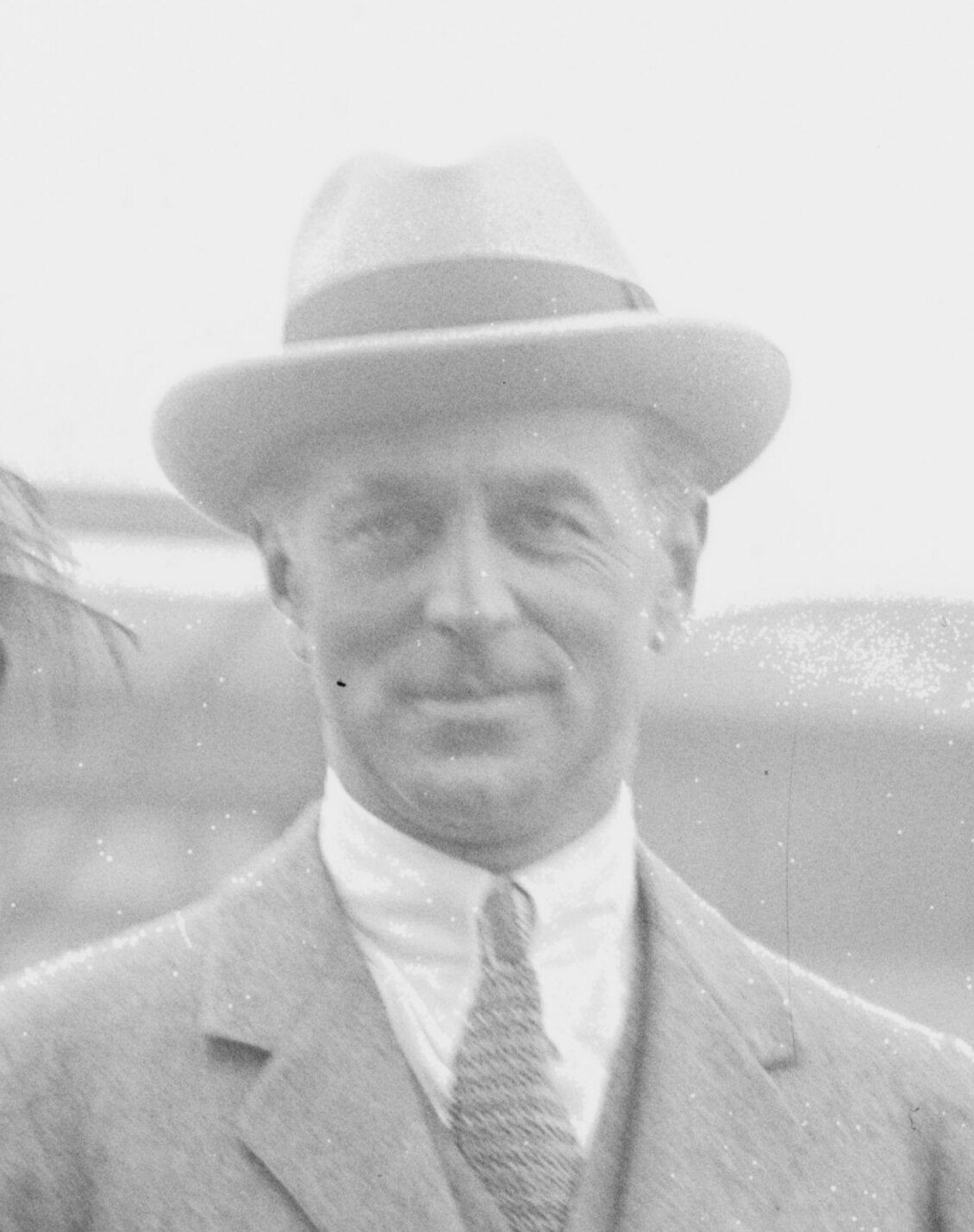
- Born: January 25, 1878; New Haven, Connecticut, U.S.
- Died: March 9, 1948 (aged 70); Los Angeles, California, U.S.
- Resting place: Grove Street Cemetery
- Education: St. Paul's School; Yale University, B.A. (1899)
- Occupations: Businessman, polo player
- Spouses: Rebecca McCullough Darlington (m. 1904; died 1913); Mary Andrews (m. 1915)

Major Louis Ezekiel Stoddard (January 25, 1878 – March 9, 1948) was an American 10-goal handicap polo player. He participated in the 1913 and 1921 International Polo Cup. He was the chairman of the United States Polo Association from 1921 to 1936. He won the Junior Polo Championship, Senior Polo Championship, U.S. Open Polo Championship and the Monty Waterbury Cup twice each.

== Early life ==
He was born in New Haven, Connecticut, on January 25, 1878, the son of Ezekiel Gilbert Stoddard, a merchant, banker and broker, and his wife Mary deForest (Burlock) Stoddard. He was educated at St. Paul's School in Concord, New Hampshire. He was graduated with a B.A. from Yale University in 1899, where he had been a member of Scroll and Key.

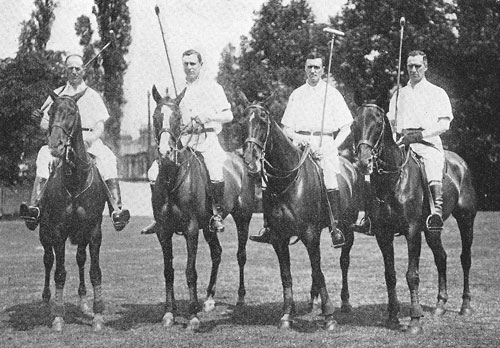
Louis Ezekiel Stoddard, Thomas Hitchcock Jr., James Watson Webb Sr. and Devereaux Milburn in 1921 at the Meadowbrook Polo Club for the International Polo Cup

== Polo ==
He learned polo at the New Haven Polo Club around 1900.

In 1909, was he was chosen as the substitute for the American polo team at the International Polo Cup. He was a substitute in the 1913 International Polo Cup and played when James Montaudevert Waterbury Jr. was injured. He participated in the 1921 International Polo Cup.

He was elected chairman of the United States Polo Association in 1922 and served until 1936.

== Business ventures ==
He was treasurer and general manager of the Beatty Starch Company in New Haven from 1899 to 1902, and subsequently was involved with mining, banking, and manufacturing firms, including the Bingham-New Haven Mining Company, Alvarado Mining and Milling Company, the New Haven Hotel Company and Factory Products Export Company, the William P. Bonbright & Company banking firm; the Fowler and Union Horsenail Co., the Marlin Arms Co., the Red River Valley Company, and the Southwest Lumber Mills.

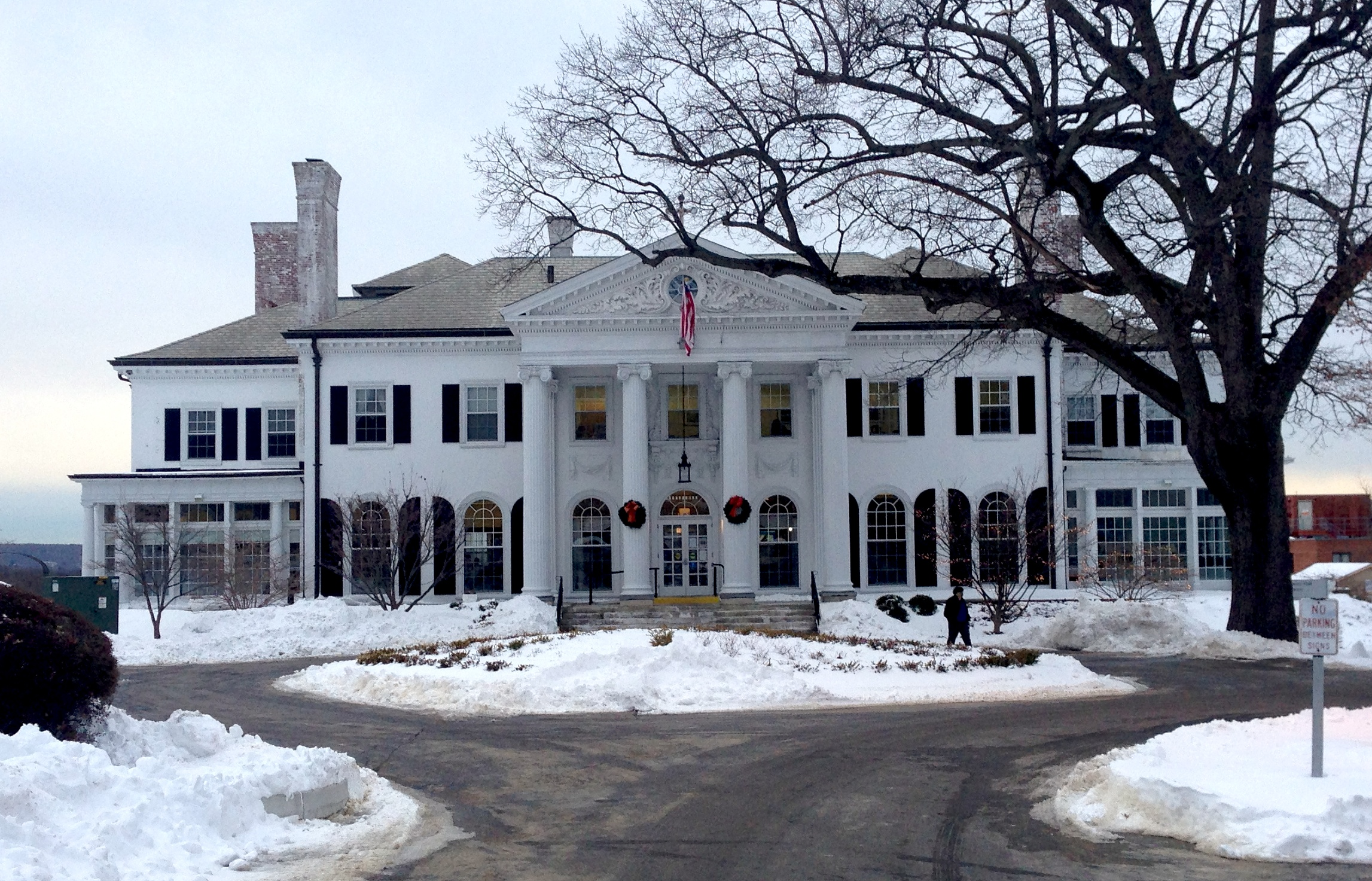
Stoddard's residence in New Haven, designed by Peabody & Stearns

== Personal life ==
He married Rebecca McCullough Darlington on November 9, 1904, in Pittsburgh, Pennsylvania. They had two daughters, Elizabeth ("Betty") Stoddard in 1907, eventual wife of Fraser M. Horn, and Barbara Stoddard in 1912, eventual wife of William Reed Kirkland, and a son, Louis Ezekiel Stoddard Jr., who like his father was also prominent as a horseman and polo player. Rebecca died of complications from childbirth on December 13, 1913.

On April 29, 1915, in New York City, he married Mary Andrews, daughter of Samuel and Mary (Cole) Andrews. They had no children. Mary (Andrews) Stoddard died on February 22, 1945.

== Death ==
He died on March 9, 1948, in Los Angeles of heart failure. He was buried in Grove Street Cemetery.
