= Ralph Gerald Ritson =

Captain Vivian Noverre Lockett, Monte Waterbury, Captain Ralph Gerald Ritson, and Lawrence Waterbury II c. 1910–1915

Lieutenant-Colonel Ralph Gerald Ritson (1880 – October 25, 1966) was a member of the Inniskilling Dragoons and a champion polo player with a ten-goal handicap.

== Biography ==
He was born in 1880 in England to Utrick Alexander Ritson, of Calf Hall, Muggleswick Park, Co. Durham, and Annie Ridley. In 1911 he won the Roehampton Trophy with fellow players Jean de Madre and Leslie St. Clair Cheape. That same year he won the King's Coronation Cup with Leslie St. Clair Cheape, Major Shah Mirza Beg of the Hyderabad Lancers, and Vivian Noverre Lockett.

He captained the British polo team in the 1913 International Polo Cup at the Meadowbrook Polo Club and his teammates were Leslie St. Clair Cheape and Vivian Noverre Lockett.

On June 1, 1926, he married Lady Kitty Vincent, daughter of David Ogilvy, 11th Earl of Airlie and Mabell Ogilvy, Countess of Airlie.

He died on October 25, 1966, in South Africa where he was working for Wiggins Teape.
