= Vivian Lockett =

British polo player

Vivian Noverre Lockett
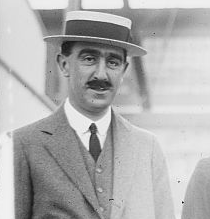
- Lockett in 1914
- Born: 18 July 1880; New Brighton, England
- Died: 30 May 1962 (aged 81); Norwich, England
- Known for: Polo champion

Olympic medal record

Men's Polo
| Gold medal – first place | 1920 Antwerp | polo |

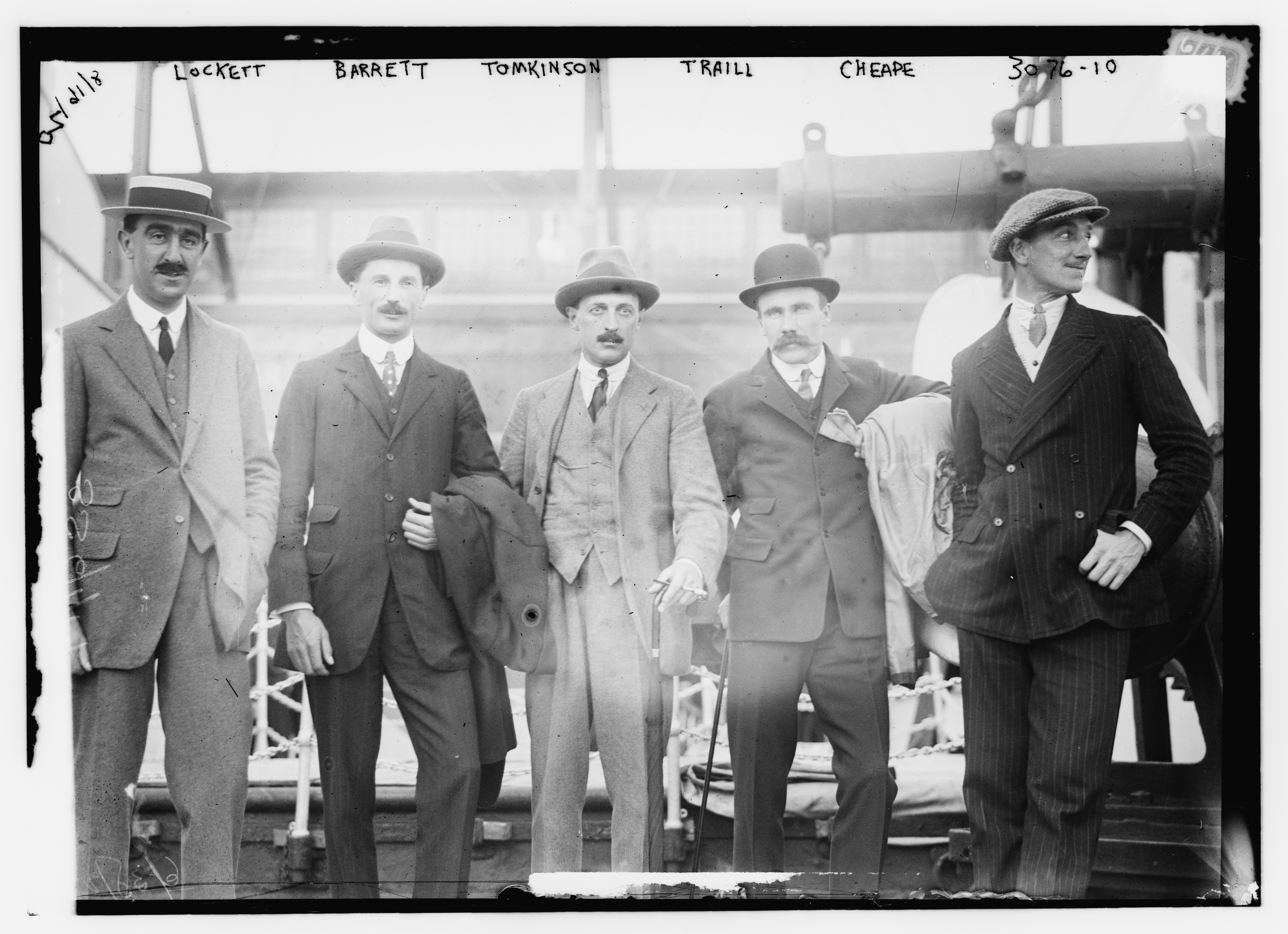
Vivian Noverre Lockett, Frederick W. Barrett, Henry Archdale Tomkinson, Johnny Traill, and Leslie Cheape, the team captain, arriving with the RMS Carmania on 1 June 1914 to play in the International Polo Cup that will be held at the Meadowbrook Polo Club

Vivian Noverre Lockett (18 July 1880 – 30 May 1962) was a colonel in the British army, and a 10 goal handicap player. He won a gold medal for the United Kingdom at the 1920 Summer Olympics in Antwerp.

== Biography ==
He was born on 18 July 1880 in New Brighton, Cheshire (now Merseyside). He attended Wellington, Trinity College, Cambridge, and Sandhurst. Upon graduating from Sandhurst, he joined the Royal Field Artillery before moving to the 17th Lancers, and in 1927 succeeded his fellow Olympian Tim Melville as Commanding Officer. He retired from the army in 1933 but was recalled in 1940 as commander of the Cavalry Training Centre in Edinburgh. He married Violet Coleman in 1915 and had three children. He died in Norwich on 30 May 1962.

== Polo career ==
Lockett competed in the International Polo Cup in five matches between 1913 and 1921, and their 1914 victory was England's last until 1997. He was part of the team that won the army's inter-regimental tournament in India in both 1913 and 1914. When polo recommenced after the war, he was part of the team that won the inter-regimental championship every year between 1920 and 1930, except in 1927. Despite all this, he surprisingly failed to win a polo Blue whilst at Cambridge.

He represented the United Kingdom in Polo at the 1920 Summer Olympics with Teignmouth Melville, Frederick W. Barrett and John Wodehouse, 3rd Earl of Kimberley. They defeated Spain in the final to win the gold medal.
