= John C. Furman =

American financier

- Born: c. 1856; New York City, U.S.
- Died: October 13, 1898 (aged 41–42); Adirondacks, New York, U.S.
- Relatives: Monte Waterbury (nephew); Lawrence Waterbury (nephew)

John C. Furman (c. 1856 – October 13, 1898) was an American financier who was a prominent member of New York society during the Gilded Age.

== Early life ==
Furman was born in New York City in c. 1856. He was the son of John McKnight Furman, and Elizabeth (née Vail) Furman. His sisters were Catherine Anthony Furman, the wife of James M. Waterbury (the parents of Monte and Lawrence Waterbury and in-laws to Gouverneur Morris), and Alice Furman, the wife of Frank Lazarus (in-laws of Charles P. Howland). After his mother died, his father remarried Miss Virginia Dimond Holmes, and through this marriage, became the elder half-brother to Silas Holmes Furman (who married Marcia Shackford), Maria Holmes Furman, the wife of W. Bond Emerson, and Reginald Furman, an Exeter and Harvard graduate who became a doctor after studying medicine at the Columbia University College of Physicians and Surgeons in New York.

== Career ==
Upon the creation of the Cordage Trust in 1887 (which was formed from the Waterbury families interest in the Waterbury Rope Company), by his brother-in-law James who was head of the Trust, Furman was made an officer and obtained a small fortune. In 1893, however, the Trust failed, and Furman lost "not only his fortune, but all his available means and was obliged to sacrifice all his property," from which he never recovered. According to his obituary in The New York Times:

"Although it has been understood that many people lost largely in Cordage securities through their investments on Mr. Furman's advice, it was always felt that he himself had been deceived as to the value of the property, and much sympathy has always been expressed for him in his misfortunes and his resultant illness, which is now followed by his death."

=== Society life ===
In 1892, Furman who was long prominent in New York society, was included in Ward McAllister's "Four Hundred", purported to be an index of New York's best families, published in The New York Times. Conveniently, 400 was the number of people that could fit into Mrs. Astor's ballroom. Before his bankruptcy, he was a member of the Knickerbocker Club, the Metropolitan Club, the Country Club, the New York Yacht Club and the Metropolitan Club in Washington, D.C.

== Personal life ==
Furman leased a large house in Pelham, New York near the Country Club at Westchester, which he decorated luxuriously and entertained lavishly.

After two years of illness, and traveling between Fort Monroe, Virginia and New York in an attempt to improve his health in milder climates, Furman died in the Adirondacks on October 13, 1898.
