= Piping Rock Club =

Country club in Matinecock, New York

Coordinates: 40°51′23″N 73°35′06″W

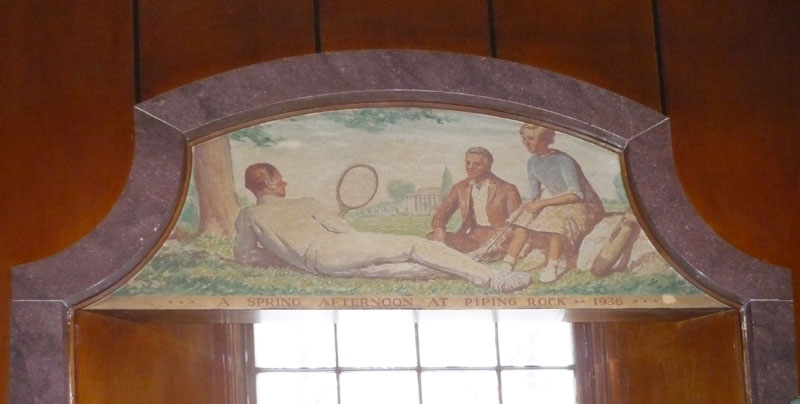
A spring afternoon at Piping Rock, 1936, by Ernest Peixotto

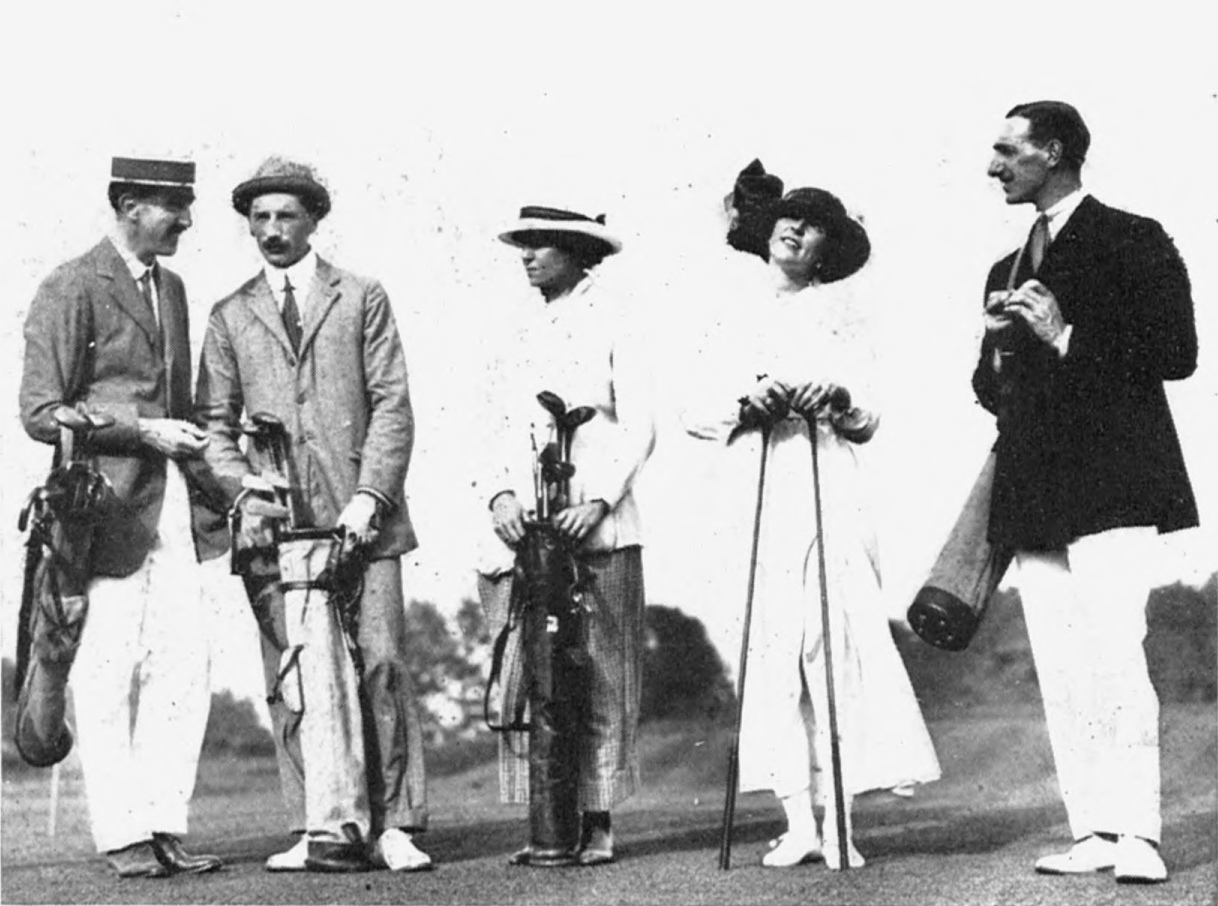
British polo players and their spouses playing golf at the Piping Rock Golf Links while visiting the US. From left to right: Captain Vivian Lockett, Captain H. A. Tomkinson, Mrs. Frederick W. Barrett, Lady Alice Grosvenor Wimborne (wife of Ivor Guest, Lord Wimborne), and Captain Leslie Cheape

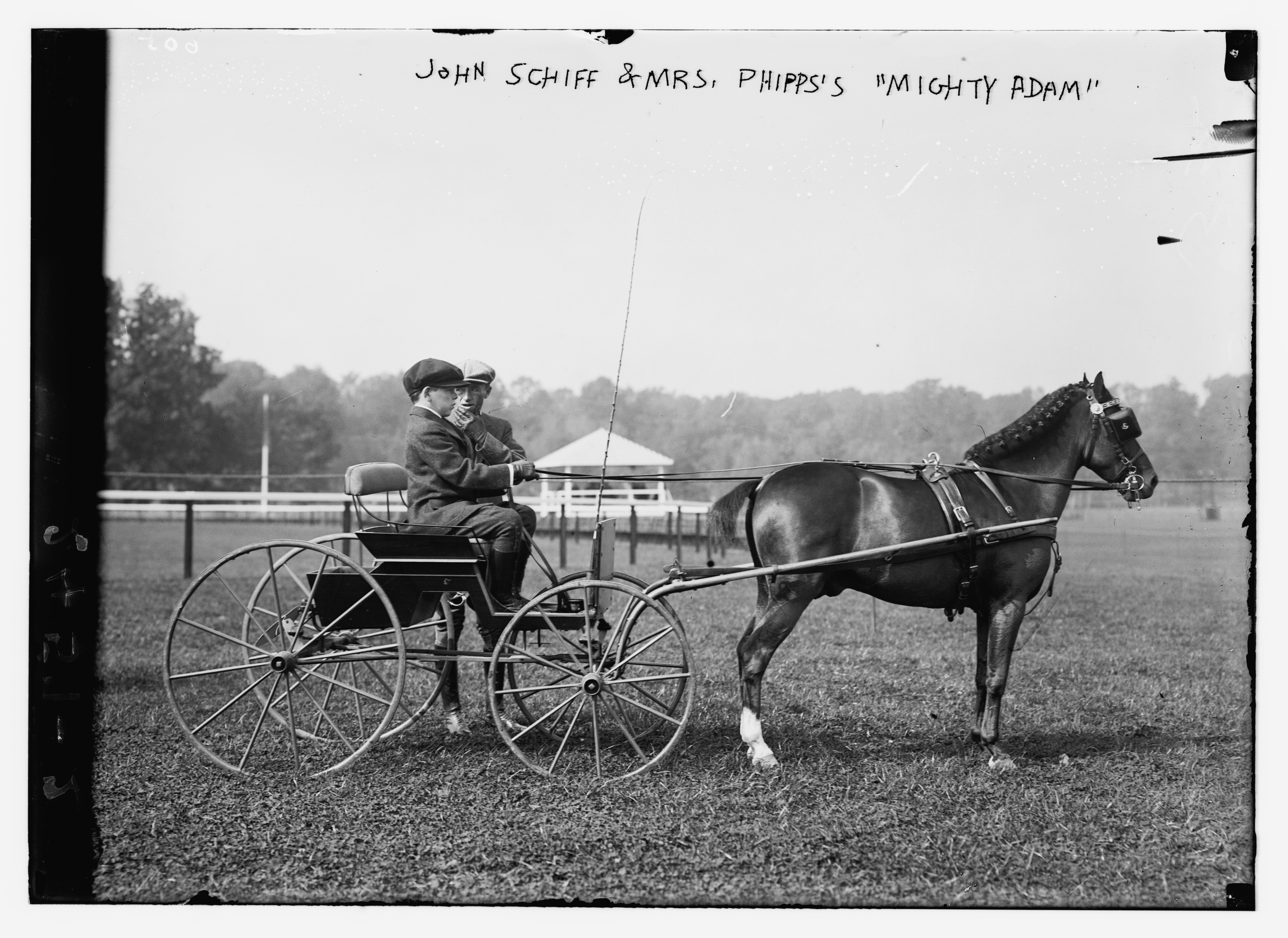
John Mortimer Schiff circa 1912–13 at the Piping Rock Horse Show

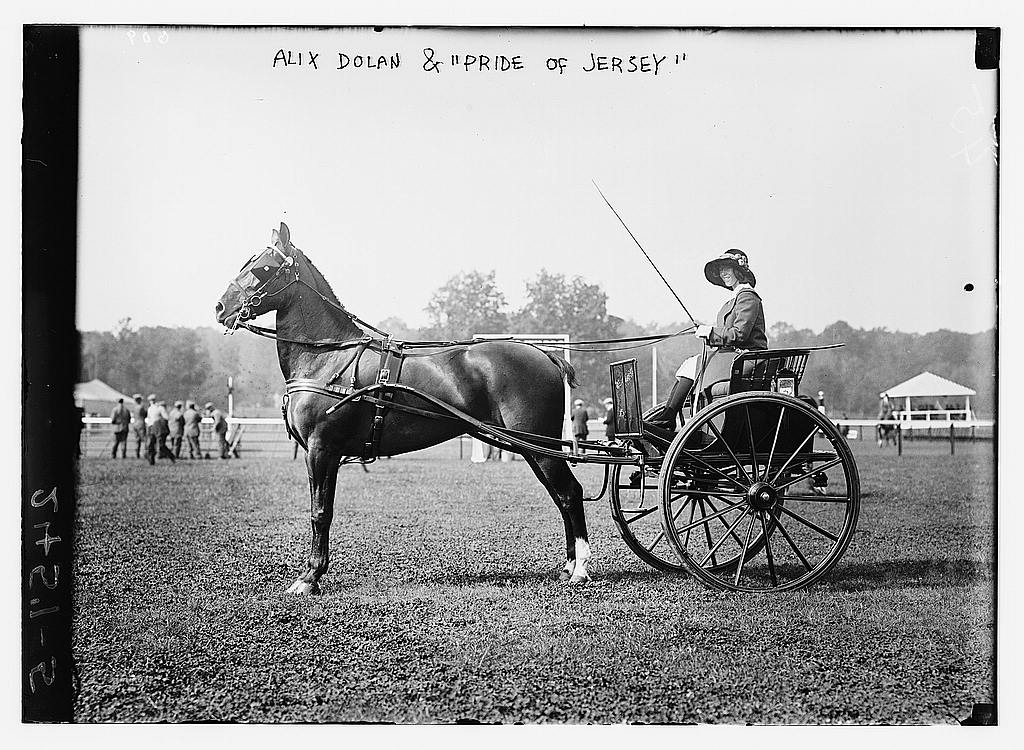
Alix Dolan and Pride of Jersey circa 1912–13 at the Piping Rock Horse Show

Piping Rock Club is a country club in Matinecock, New York. It falls within the ZIP Code boundaries of Locust Valley, New York, in Nassau County, on Long Island. Its name was reportedly attributed to a large boulder which marked where Native Americans would gather and smoke pipes.

== History ==
The Piping Rock clubhouse was designed by American designer Guy Lowell and built in 1911. Lowell based his designs on American colonial architecture and a desire to link the house with the landscape. Most of the rooms open into a hall that surrounds an internal courtyard.

The Piping Rock Club has an 18-hole links-style golf course that was designed by Charles B. Macdonald. Its tennis facilities include several indoor courts, clay courts and grass courts. A separate facility on Long Island Sound provides beach, pool and summer dining facilities for members. In 1913, an article described additional outdoor activities that occurred there: "polo, riding, racaing, steeplechasing, hunting...squash, pigeon-shooting...." and that the property featured "a circular mile race track...two mile and a half steeplechase track around that...".

The club hosted the Piping Rock Horse Show from at least 1912 to 1915. On October 24, 1937 Cole Porter was in a riding accident there that crushed his legs, leading to one of them being amputated years later.

== Members ==
It was the "Augusta of its Day". Members included J. P. Morgan Jr., Benjamin Strong Jr., the first president of the Federal Reserve Bank of New York; Percy Chubb, co-founder of the insurance company; Louis Comfort Tiffany stained glass; Frank Nelson Doubleday, publishing; Condé Montrose Nast, publishing; William L. Harkness, Standard Oil; Frederic B. Pratt, George Dupont Pratt, Harold I. Pratt, Standard Oil heirs and philanthropists; W. Averell Harriman, future New York Governor; Payne Whitney; Alfred Gwynne Vanderbilt; and Vincent Astor.

== In popular culture ==
In Mad Men: "The Quality of Mercy" (the season 6 penultimate episode), Jim Cutler invites the agency's St. Joseph's client to golf at Piping Rock "while there's still grass left".

In Nelson DeMille's The Gold Coast, the narrator John Sutter describes Piping Rock as one of only two country clubs that count. "Piping Rock is considered more exclusive than The Creek, and I suppose it is, as its membership list more closely matches the Social Register than does The Creek’s. But they don’t have skeet shooting."

In Dominick Dunne's 1990 novel An Inconvenient Woman, the club is described as extremely exclusive and is frequented by a character's bridge-playing father.
