= Kihikihi Polo Club =

Polo club in New Zealand

The Kihikihi Polo Club is a historic polo club in Kihikihi, New Zealand. Founded in 1892, it has hosted many international tournaments, including the Waikato Open and the New Zealand Savile Cup.

== Location ==
The club is located in Oliver street, Kihikihi, a rural part of New Zealand.

== History ==
The club was founded by the Kay family in 1892. It has been affiliated with the Auckland Provincial Polo Association and the New Zealand Polo Association since 1910. It was located at the Greenhill Estate, owned by William Taylor. It then moved to Orakau, Waikeria, and Parawera.

In 1946, it moved to the Kihikihi Domain, the current location. There are three polo grounds, one of which serves as the site of the yearly "Nga Rakau" International Polo Day. The club has constructed a fourth ground in Korakonui, which is 15 minutes' drive south of Kihikihi. The summer months are when polo is played.

The club hosts many national and international matches. In 1981, it hosted a match with an American team comprising Steve Flores, Joel Baker, Mike Conant, and Peter Baldwin. In 2008, the club hosted the first international test match of the year. The England team (James Beim, Mark Tomlinson, Malcolm Borwick, and Tom Morley) lost to the All Blacks team (Tommy Wilson, Craig Wilson, John Paul Clarkin, and Simon Keyte). In 2014, it hosted the Waikato Open. That year, it also hosted the New Zealand Savile Cup.

== Bibliography ==
- Archie Kay. The Kihikihi Polo Club, 1892-1992. The club, 1992. 120 pages.
