= Malcolm Stevenson (polo) =

American polo player

Malcolm Stevenson was an American champion polo player in what was known as the Big Four.

== Biography ==
He was born around 1880 to A. L. Stevenson and he had a brother Philip Stevenson. On October 3, 1901, he married Caroline Livingstone. In 1920, he married for the second time to Maud A. Kennedy, a day or two after being thrown from his polo horse. He played in the 1927 International Polo Cup with James Watson Webb, Sr., Thomas Hitchcock, Jr. and Devereaux Milburn. He was inducted into the Museum of Polo and Hall of Fame.
