= Frank Brereton Hurndall =

Major Frank Brereton Hurndall (1883 – 14 January 1968) of the 20th Hussars was an English polo player. He was captain of the 1924 British polo team that competed in the International Polo Cup.

== Biography ==
He was born in 1883. He enlisted in the 20th Hussars on 22 April 1903. He was promoted to lieutenant on 21 July 1906 and promoted to captain on 15 July 1911. He was a captain during World War I and when his commanding officer was wounded, he took over command of the unit.

He played for England in the 1924 International Polo Cup against the United States alongside Thomas William Kirkwood and Teignmouth Philip Melvill, Geoffrey H. Phipps-Hornby, Sr., Eric Garnett Atkinson and Lewis Lawrence Lacey.

From 1937–1947 he was colonel of the 14th/20th Hussars.

He died on 14 January 1968 in Torquay in England.
