= Beim =

Beim is a surname. Notable people with the surname include:

- James Beim (born 1980), English polo player
- Tom Beim (born 1975), English rugby union football player
- Valeri Beim (born 1950), Austrian chess grandmaster and author
