= Harry Rich =

English polo player

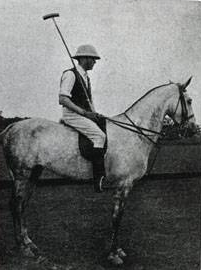
Rich in 1901

Captain Harry Rich (circa 1875 – 8 October 1930), also known as Henry Rich, was an English champion polo player. He was a six-goal handicap player and was the winner of the Narragansett Cup and the Gladstone Cup. He was a member of the Polo Pony Society.

== Biography ==
He was born in England around 1875. He had a brother Frank Rich who was the polo instructor for the Prince of Wales; and Herbert Thomas Rich.

in 1901 he won the County Cup playing at Eden Park with Percy Bullivant, Hubert Marsham, and Hugh Cardwell.

In 1906 he was described as "brilliant, though he is apt at times to be a little erratic."

He participated in the 1909 International Polo Cup held at The Hurlingham Club with team-mates, Herbert Haydon Wilson, Frederick Maitland Freake, Patteson Womersley Nickalls, John Wodehouse, 3rd Earl of Kimberley and John Hardress Lloyd. His team lost to the United States.

In 1909 he won the County Cup playing at Kingsbury with Julian Winans, Gordon Withers, and Paul Winans.

In 1913 he won the All Ireland Open Cup playing at Hillmorton with William Balding, John Drage, and Stanley Barton.

He died in Hillmorton in England on 8 October 1930 from a self-inflicted double barrelled shotgun wound.

== See also ==
- Raymond Rodgers Belmont, American polo player who took his own life
