= Arthur Noel Edwards =

English polo player (1883–1915)

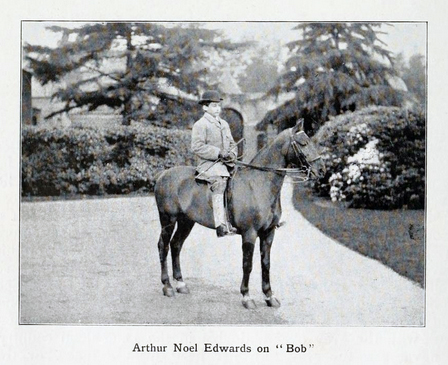
Arthur Noel Edwards in the 1890s

Captain Arthur Noel Edwards (10 December 1883 – 25 May 1915) was an English polo player who was an alternate in the 1911 and 1913 International Polo Cup.

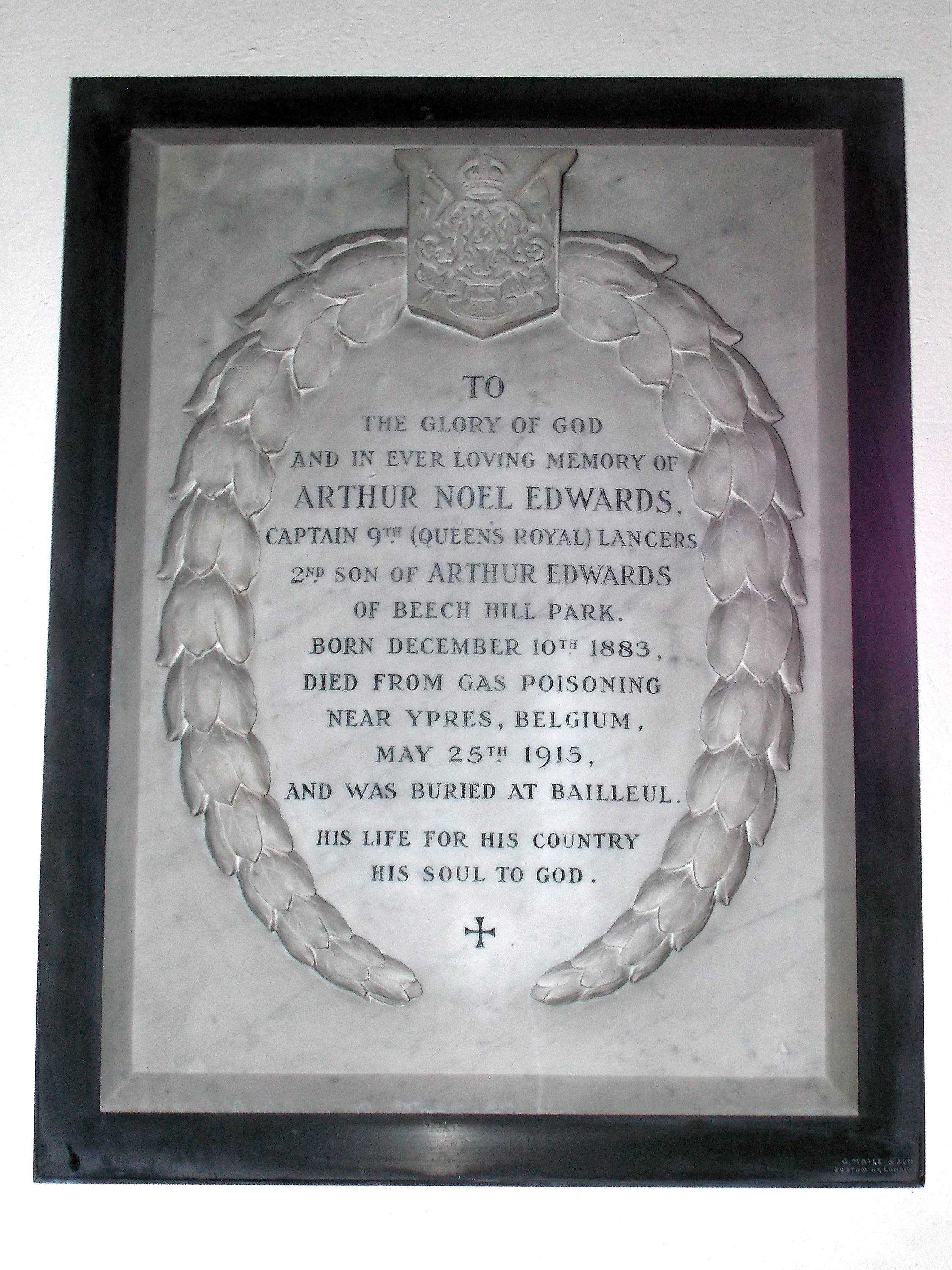
Arthur Noel Edwards memorial, High Beach

== Origins ==
He was born on 10 December 1883, the second son of Arthur Edwards of Beech Hill Park, Waltham Abbey, Essex, by his wife Hilda Tennant, a daughter of Robert Tennant (1828–1900) of Chapel House in the parish of Conistone, Yorkshire, Member of Parliament for Leeds. His brother was the cricketer Guy Janion Edwards (1881–1962).

== Career ==
Arthur Noel Edwards participated in the 1911 and 1913 International Polo Cup at the Meadowbrook Polo Club as an alternate.

He was a captain in the 9th Queen's Royal Lancers and died in World War I on 25 May 1915 as the result of a poison gas attack by the Germans during the Second Battle of Ypres. He was buried in Bailleul Communal Cemetery Extension.

He was later re-interred in High Beech, and there is a memorial to him in the Church of the Holy Innocents, High Beach, Epping, in Essex.
