= Hurndall =

Hurndall is a surname. Notable people with the surname include:

- Frank Brereton Hurndall (1883–1968), English polo player
- Richard Hurndall (1910–1984), English actor
- Tom Hurndall (1981–2004), English activist
