= Monte Waterbury =

American businessman and 10-goal polo handicap player

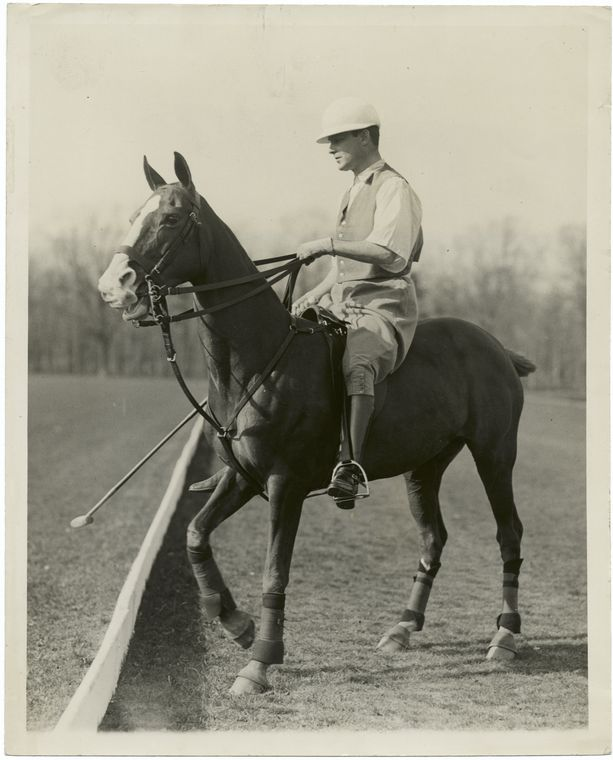
- Monte Waterbury in 1914.

Personal information
- Born: April 24, 1876 Westchester, New York
- Died: August 28, 1920 (aged 44) French Lick, Indiana

Horse racing career
- Sport: Horse racing

Major racing wins
- International Polo Cup (1909, 1911, 1913)

Honours
- The Monty Waterbury Cup is named in his honor. Inducted into the Museum of Polo and Hall of Fame (1993)

Significant horses
- Strawberry

James Montaudevert "Monte" Waterbury Jr. (April 24, 1876 – August 28, 1920) was an American businessman and a 10-goal polo handicap player. Together with his brother Lawrence Waterbury, Harry Payne Whitney and Devereaux Milburn, known collectively as the "Big Four," he competed and won the 1909 International Polo Cup.

== Early life ==
Monte was born on April 24, 1876, in Westchester, New York. He was one of seven children born to James Montaudevert Waterbury Sr. and Catherine Anthony "Kate" (née Furman) Waterbury. He had four brothers and two sisters, including Lawrence Waterbury, Livingston Waterbury, Reginald Waterbury, Katherine Livingston Waterbury and Elsie Waterbury, who married Gouverneur Morris.

His paternal grandparents were Lawrence Waterbury I and Caroline Antoinette (née Cleveland) Waterbury. The Waterbury family was considered one of New York's oldest families. His maternal grandfather was John M. Furman.

He was educated through private tutors and graduated from Columbia University.

== Career ==
Waterbury's family owned the Waterbury Company, a manufacturing company that specialized in wire and manila rope and was located at 63 Park Row, and which Monte was serving as president at the time of his death in 1920.

=== Polo career ===
Captain Vivian Noverre Lockett, Monte Waterbury, Captain Ralph Gerald Ritson, and Lawrence Waterbury II, c. 1910 – c. 1915.

Waterbury was an active polo player in the 1890s through the 1910s, including the 1909 team put together by Harry Payne Whitney nicknamed the "Big Four", composed of Monte, his brother Lawrence, Whitney and Devereaux Milburn. They defeated England, which had held the cup since its inauguration in 1886. He has won the International Polo Cup five times, in 1902, 1909, 1911, 1913, and 1914. He won the first U.S. Open Polo Championship in 1904, and ten senior titles. During the 1913 Cup, he "sustained a broken, making it impossible for him to hold a mallet" and was replaced by Louis Stoddard.

He was a member of the Meadowbrook Polo Club along with his brother Lawrence. He usually preferred to play the back position, but the team would often rotate positions as the game was being played.

Waterbury did not play polo internationally after the 1914 defeat at the International Polo Cup (with Ivor Guest, Lord Wimborne in charge of the British team). and only rarely pursued the sport in the United States in his later years.

== Personal life ==
Waterbury was linked to stage actress Eleanor Pendleton, who later married Louis Ream, son of millionaire businessman Norman B. Ream. After Eleanor's divorce from Ream, she moved into the Hotel St. Louis, across from Waterbury's apartment at the northwest corner of Madison Avenue and 32nd Street, and they resumed their relationship. They were rumored to have been engaged, but a wedding never took place. Waterbury also dated infamous showgirl Evelyn Nesbit before her marriage to crazed lunatic Harry K. Thaw. Thaw murdered New York architect and socialite Stanford White in a rooftop killing.

Waterbury died at the age of 44 on August 28, 1920, from an apparent heart attack one day after arriving at a health resort in French Lick, Indiana. He had been in poor health in the year preceding his death and it was generally accepted by his family that he had been suffering from a heart condition. After a funeral at St. Bartholomew's Church, he was buried in the churchyard of St. Peter's Church in Westchester.

=== Legacy ===
The annual Monty Waterbury Cup at the Meadow Brook Club in Westbury, Long Island was named in his honor, with the first match occurring in 1922.
