= Big Four (polo) =

American polo team

The Big Four in polo was the American polo team that competed for the International Polo Cup during the early 20th century.

== History ==
The term was first used in 1909 for the team of Devereux Milburn, Harry Payne Whitney, Lawrence Waterbury, and Monte Waterbury. The term was still in use for the 1927 team of James Watson Webb II, Tommy Hitchcock Jr., Malcolm Stevenson, and Devereux Milburn.
