= New Haven Polo Club =

Polo club in New Haven, Connecticut

The New Haven Polo Club was in New Haven, Connecticut. The club won the Junior Polo Championship at Van Cortlandt Park on September 5, 1908.

== Members ==
- Louis Ezekiel Stoddard
