= Remount =

Remount referred to the provision of fresh horses, particularly for military purposes. The word encompasses both the animals themselves and the means by which they were provided. In many cases, remounts were horses provided to replace those killed or injured in battle.

The origins of the concept date to the 15th century. Military-based organization of remount programs can be dated to the late 1700s, when both Great Britain and the colonies of what became the United States each created programs for the purchase and training of military animals.

The need for remounts for military use declined with the use of horses in warfare generally, particularly following World War II, when both the United States and the United Kingdom disbanded their military remount programs, in some cases reassigning them to agricultural and ceremonial purposes.

The concept was expanded in the 20th century by the United States Forest Service to the provisioning of horses and mules for packing in equipment and personnel for fighting forest fires. As road networks expanded and the use of smokejumpers increased, this use of remounts also declined.

== See also ==
- Army Remount Service
- United States Army Remount Service
