= Army Remount Service =

- Active: 1887–1942
- Country: United Kingdom
- Branch: Army

The Army Remount Service was the body responsible for the purchase and training of horses and mules as remounts for the British Army between 1887 and 1942.

== Origins ==
Prior to 1887, the purchase of horses was the responsibility of individual regimental colonels, in the case of cavalry regiments, or of agents acting on behalf of the artillery and engineers. This system worked well enough in peacetime but rapidly broke down during war when demand exceeded supply, prices rose and, the price that could be paid per horse being set by the Government, regimental purchasing officers and agents were frequently left with the most inferior animals. Consequently, in 1887 the Remount Department was set up in order to ensure the uniformity and suitability of the animals purchased for the army, and their training. Owners were encouraged to register a proportion of their horses with the Department, the Department having the option of purchasing these animals for a fixed sum in time of emergency. In recompense for this, the owners were paid a pension of 10/- per year for each animal.

In 1891, the service became part of the Army Service Corps (ASC) and the majority of other ranks at remount depots were drawn from the ASC.

Initially, there were three remount depots, the Remount Establishment at Woolwich (which provided horses for the Royal Artillery, Royal Engineers and Army Service Corps) and two in Dublin (for the cavalry), with a total Army establishment of 12,500 horses and mules. The Boer War showed these arrangements to have been entirely inadequate (326,000 horses and 51,000 mules were lost, mainly through disease), so the animal establishment was increased to 25,000 and two additional depots were authorized, at Melton Mowbray, and Arborfield. In 1911, a further depot, the privately owned Pilckard's Farm in Chiddingfold near Godalming, was given to the War Office by its owners for a period of 21 years. These depots provided total remount accommodation in the United Kingdom for some 1,200 animals.

The Remount Service was only responsible for supplying horses and mules for use in Britain. Animals used by the Indian Army were entirely purchased by the Indian Government and those used by the British Army in the Middle East and elsewhere were bought by the local General Officer Commanding.

== The Great War ==
The outbreak of war in 1914, therefore, found the British Army with a total establishment of 25,000 horses and mules, five Remount Depots and four Remount companies, with a remount strength of approximately 1,200 animals. Within 12 days, the establishment had been increased to 165,000 animals, entirely by impressment, and a year later, in August 1915, to 534,971. At its peak in 1917, the Army establishment reached almost 870,000 horses and mules, with remount accommodation for 60,000 animals. To cope with this increase, four additional main Home depots were established, at Shirehampton, Romsey, Ormskirk and Swaythling, and the capacity and complement of each depot were also increased. At Swaythling, for example, on 1 April 1919 (several months after the end of the war), 3,530 horses and mules were stabled and cared for by 757 men. The first three of these depots were used for horses and mules arriving from overseas, whilst Swaythling was a collection centre for animals being shipped abroad. Several other smaller depots were established throughout the country for receipt of locally bred horses.

The establishment of officers and men was also increased to cope with this number of animals, from 121 officers and 230 men in August 1914 to 423 officers and 20,560 men in 1917. Many of the remount officers were drawn from the landed gentry, masters of fox hounds and others who had experience with horses in civilian life, thus avoiding withdrawing army officers from their normal duties. Such remount officers included the well known artists Alfred Munnings, Cecil Aldin, G. Denholm Armour and Lionel Edwards, and Scots-Australian poet Will H. Ogilvie.

A Base Remount Depot and two Advanced Remount Depots went to France with the British Expeditionary Force in 1914 and were subsequently supplemented by two further Base Remount Depots at the Channel Ports. At the peak of operations, these had an establishment of 16,000 to 17,000 animals. Depots were set up in Egypt and Salonika for the campaigns in those regions. Animals for these areas were originally obtained from Australia (horses) and North America (mules) although, owing to difficulties with transport, all animals were later supplied from Britain. The supply of animals for the Mesopotamian Campaign was undertaken by the Indian Government.

Over the course of the war, a total of 468,323 horses were purchased in the United Kingdom, 428,608 horses and 275,097 mules in North America, 6,000 horses and 1,500 mules came from South America, and 3,700 mules from Spain and Portugal. Between 1914 and 1920, the Remount Service spent £67.5 million on the purchase and training of these animals. There was initial concern that the neutrality of the United States might prevent the purchase of animals in that country, but this proved not to be the case and remount purchasing delegations were set up in Kansas City, St Louis, Chicago, Fort Worth and Denver. In addition to the British Army, the British Remount Service supplied animals to the Belgian, Canadian, Australian, New Zealand and Portuguese armies, and even the American Expeditionary Force.

== Later years ==
The mechanization of the British Army during the 1930s substantially reduced the Army's need for horses in the Second World War, although mules were still used as pack animals in rough terrain, particularly in Burma and Italy. However, the number of animals required was relatively small and in 1942 the Army Remount Service was amalgamated into the Army Veterinary and Remount Service.

== See also ==
- British cavalry during the First World War

== Bibliography ==
- Moore-Colyer, Richard (1995) Aspects of Horse Breeding and the Supply of Horses in Victorian Britain. Agricultural History Review, 45, pp 47–60.
- Singleton, John (1993) Britain's Military Use of Horses 1914–1918. Past and Present, 139, pp 178–203.
- War Office, The (1902) Proceedings of a Court of Enquiry held at St. Stephen's House, Westminster, S.W., on the Administration of the Army Remount Department since January 1899. London: HMSO.
- War Office, The (1922) Statistics of the Military Effort of the British Empire during the Great War, 1914-1920. London: HMSO.
