= Claire Tomlinson =

English polo player (1944–2022)

Personal information
- Full name: Claire Janet Tomlinson
- Nationality: British
- Born: 14 February 1944
- Died: 12 January 2022 (aged 77)
- Spouse: Simon Tomlinson (divorced)

Sport
- Sport: Polo
- University team: Oxford University
- Club: Beaufort Club
- Team: England Polo Team
- Coached by: Maharaj Prem Singh, Jorge Marín Moreno

Achievements and titles
- Highest world ranking: +5, highest ranked woman world-wide
- Updated on 4 August 2013

Claire Janet Tomlinson (née Lucas, 14 February 1944 – 12 January 2022) was an English polo player and pony breeder. She was the highest-rated female polo player and coached the English national team she once captained.

== Biography ==
Tomlinson was born on 14 February 1944, as the daughter of Ethel (née Daer) and Lascelles Arthur Lucas, who founded Woolmers Park Polo Club on a 250-acre estate in Hertfordshire in 1949. Her father was instrumental in the revival of polo in England after the Second World War.

She went from Wycombe Abbey to take A-levels at Millfield and, while there, was selected for the British junior fencing team. Going on to study agricultural economics at Somerville College, Oxford, it was not long before she was awarded a squash blue and a fencing half-blue and was short-listed for the Olympic fencing team. When she was told that the Oxford University Polo team (OUPC) was short of players, her father's approval was obtained, and she took up polo seriously. Her participation in the 1964 Varsity Match as the first female player was a milestone in the history of the match; cautiously, the club had entered her as Mr Lucas. In 1966, she became the first female captain of OUPC. In her final year at university, she was rated at nought-goals.

Her first job for a British company brought her to Buenos Aires, Argentina. There, she accompanied her brother, John, who was a 6-goal player who won the Queen's Cup and Gold Cup in 1967, to buy horses, and got to know Jorge Marín Moreno with whom she started playing. Her standard of polo improved to such an extent that, on her return to England, she formed the Los Locos (the Mad Ones) polo team with a cavalry officer (Simon Tomlinson, whom she later married). She became one of polo's few true masters of the number one position and the first woman in the world to rise to five goals in 1986. She swept away the rule forbidding women in British high-goal and became the first to compete on equal terms with men at the top tier. She was the first woman to win the County Cup (1972) and the Queen's Cup (1979), having fought for her participation after the Hurlingham Polo Association (HPA) repeatedly denied her entry to the high-goal tournaments, although her handicap was higher than of many other male participants in the Queen's and Gold Cup. She still holds the women's high-goal handicap record today.

Tomlinson was the chairman of the Beaufort Polo Club, Gloucestershire, which she and Simon re-established in 1989. The club is near Highgrove House, home of Prince Charles; she taught his sons Prince William and Prince Harry at Beaufort.

In 1993, with Hugh Dawnay, she instigated and set up a coaching system for the H.P.A. from scratch, which has had a profound effect on how players are taught. She was one of six official H.P.A. team coaches, and regularly coached British squads at F.I.P. championships as well as holding sessions for the H.P.A. Junior Development Squad at Down Farm.

She bred polo ponies, starting in the 1970s, and was pro-active with the breeding programme in the UK and Argentina, which included Beaufort Embryo Transfer.

== Personal life and death ==
In 1968, she married Simon Tomlinson, whom she got to know at university. The couple had three children. Their home at Down Farm, near Tetbury, Gloucestershire, burned while the family was away on holiday in April 1996, and was a total loss. Their marriage ended in divorce.

Claire Tomlinson died on 13 January 2022, at the age of 77. She is survived by her daughter, Emma Tomlinson, a veterinarian and registered polo coach, and her sons, Mark and Luke Tomlinson, both of whom are high-goal polo players who compete internationally.
