= Guy Edwards (cricketer) =

English cricketer (1881–1962)

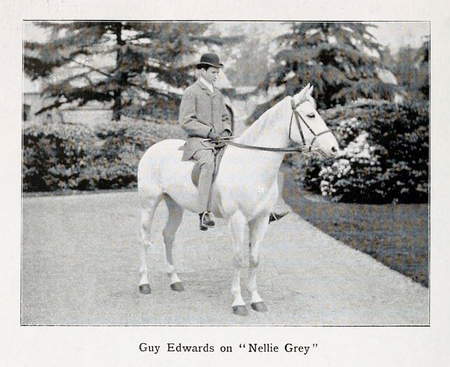
Guy Edwards in the 1890s

Guy Janion Edwards MC (11 May 1881 – 30 September 1962) was an English cricketer active in 1907 who played for Essex. He was born in Kensington and died in Upper Slaughter. He appeared in two first-class matches as a righthanded batsman who scored 45 runs with a highest score of 21.

He served in the Coldstream Guards in World War I and was awarded an MC in 1917.

== Origins ==
He was a son of Arthur Edwards of Beech Hill Park, Waltham Abbey, Essex, by his wife Hilda Tennant, a daughter of Robert Tennant (1828–1900) of Chapel House in the parish of Conistone, Yorkshire, Member of Parliament for Leeds. His younger brother was the polo player Captain Arthur Noel Edwards (1883–1915).
