= Hugh Hesketh Hughes =

Welsh polo player

Hugh Hesketh Hughes (October 1902 – 23 May 1940) was a Welsh champion polo player who trained in Argentina.

== Biography ==
He was born in October 1902 in Flintshire, Wales. He participated in the 1936 International Polo Cup. He was a second lieutenant in the Welsh Guards during World War II and was killed on 23 May 1940 in France. He is buried in the St. Martin-Boulogne Communal Cemetery.
