= Beaufort Polo Club =

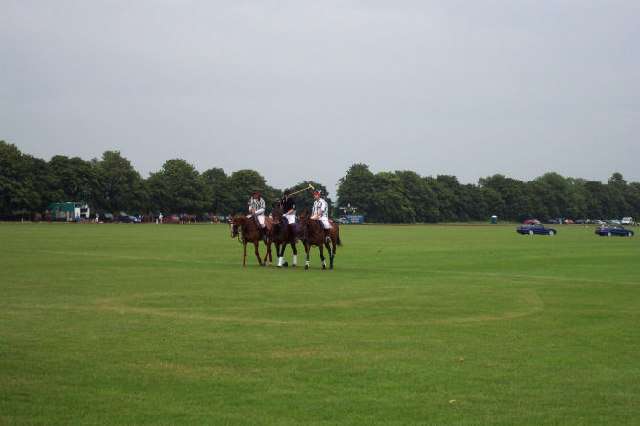
Beaufort Polo Club in 2003

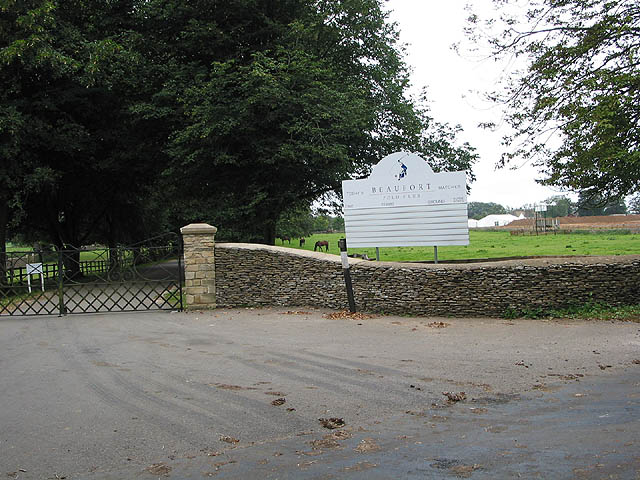
Entrance to the polo club in 2007

The Beaufort Polo Club is a polo club in Gloucestershire, England.

== History ==
The club was started by Captain Frank Henry in 1872, when he returned from the 9th Queen's Royal Lancers and joined the Gloucestershire Royal Yeomanry. Players included members of the Duke of Beaufort's Hunt, under the presidency of Henry Somerset, 9th Duke of Beaufort. It was located at Big Field in Norton, between Malmesbury and Hullavington on the Pinkney Estate.

In 1929, Herbert C. Cox, a Canadian polo player, revived it at Down Farm, alongside the Westonbirt Arboretum near Tetbury. It fell in abeyance in 1939.

In 1977, Simon and Claire Tomlinson, of the Los Locos polo team, bought Down Farm. They revived the club and it joined the Hurlingham Polo Association in 1989. The Tomlinsons' sons, Mark and Luke Tomlinson, are polo players. Charles, Prince of Wales is a patron, and Prince William, Duke of Cambridge has played polo at the club.
