= Lawrence Waterbury =

American champion polo player and society figure

Larry Waterbury
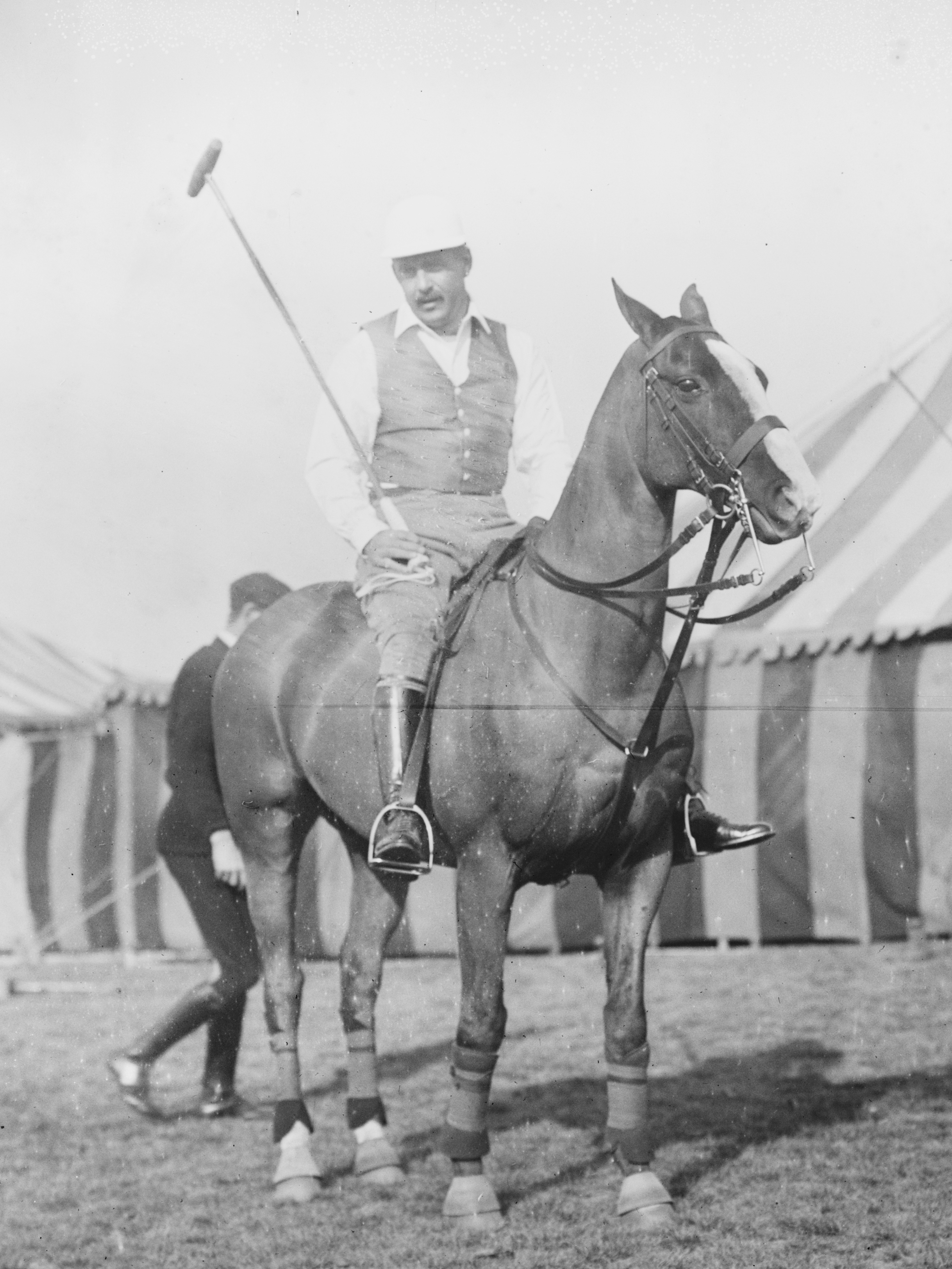
- Waterbury c. 1914
- Born: Lawrence Waterbury II; March 31, 1877; New York City, New York, U.S.
- Died: May 25, 1943 (aged 66); Palm Beach, Florida
- Education: Westminster School
- Occupation: Polo player
- Spouses: Maude Livingston Hall (m. 1900; div. 1912) Caroline Louise Munn Boardman (m. 1932)
- Parents: James M. Waterbury (father); Catherine Anthony Furman (mother)
- Relatives: Monty Waterbury (brother); Anna Hall Roosevelt (sister-in-law); Gurnee Munn (brother-in-law)

Lawrence Waterbury II (March 31, 1877 – May 25, 1943) was an American champion polo player and society figure.

== Early life ==
Larry, as he was referred to by friends, was born on March 31, 1877, in New York City. He was one of seven children born to Catherine Anthony "Kate" (née Furman) Waterbury and James Montaudevert Waterbury, Sr. (1851–1931). Among his siblings were James Montaudevert Waterbury, Jr. and Livingston Waterbury.

His paternal grandparents were Lawrence Waterbury I and Caroline Antoinette (née Cleveland) Waterbury. The Waterbury family was considered one of New York's oldest families. His maternal grandfather was John M. Furman.

Waterbury attended the Westminster School.

== Career ==
Waterbury became a stockbroker and, reportedly, made a fortune in the 1907 bear market, also known as the Panic of 1907. Later, he was reported to have suffered great losses and in 1923, during an investigation of the so-called "Mammoth Syndicate", he was identified as one of the members who formed a group to "make a market" for the stock of Mammoth Oil, a subsidiary of Sinclair Oil Corporation. The scandal was later referred to as the Teapot Dome scandal.

=== Polo playing ===
Waterbury began playing with the Westchester Country Club polo team in 1895, and the following year, he was ranked at seven goals on the U.S. Polo Association handicap list. He later played at the Meadowbrook Polo Club with his brother Monte.

He participated in the 1902, 1909, 1911 and 1913 International Polo Cup championships, losing only in 1902. Waterbury played polo with many of the most prominent figures of his time, including his brother Monte, Devereaux Milburn, J. S. Phipps, E. W. Hopping, Harry Payne Whitney, and Henry Carnegie Phipps.

At the time of his death, he was the "only man to ever play every position in the international polo competition between Great Britain and the United States."

=== Military service ===
During World War I, he was a lieutenant in the United States Office of Naval Intelligence and later became a captain in the Chemical Warfare Section in France.

== Personal life ==
In 1900, he married his first wife, Maude Livingston Hall (1877–1952), the youngest daughter of Valentine Hall Jr. and Mary Livingston Ludlow. Maude was the sister of Anna Hall (Mrs. Elliott Bulloch Roosevelt), and therefore the maternal aunt of Eleanor Roosevelt and her husband, Franklin D. Roosevelt. Before they divorced in 1912, they were the parents of two children:

- Lawrence Waterbury III (b. 1901)
- Anne Livingston "Nancy" Waterbury (1903–1959), who married Harry Carter Milholland Jr. (1904–1968), son of Harry Carter Milholland of Pittsburgh, in 1927. After Nancy's death, he married Marion Bock Kellogg.

After their divorce, Maude married David Gray, who later served as United States Envoy to Ireland. In 1932, Waterbury married his second wife, Caroline Louise "Carrie" Munn (1889–1979), formerly the wife of Reginald Boardman. She was the daughter of Charles Alexander Munn and Carrie Louise (née Gurnee) Munn, and the sister of Gurnee Munn, and Charles Alexander Munn Jr., who married Mary Astor Paul in 1909.

For many years, he lived at 132 East 38th Street in New York City. Waterbury died on May 25, 1943, at his home on Pelican Lane in Palm Beach, Florida.
