= Tommy Hitchcock Jr. =

American polo player and aviator

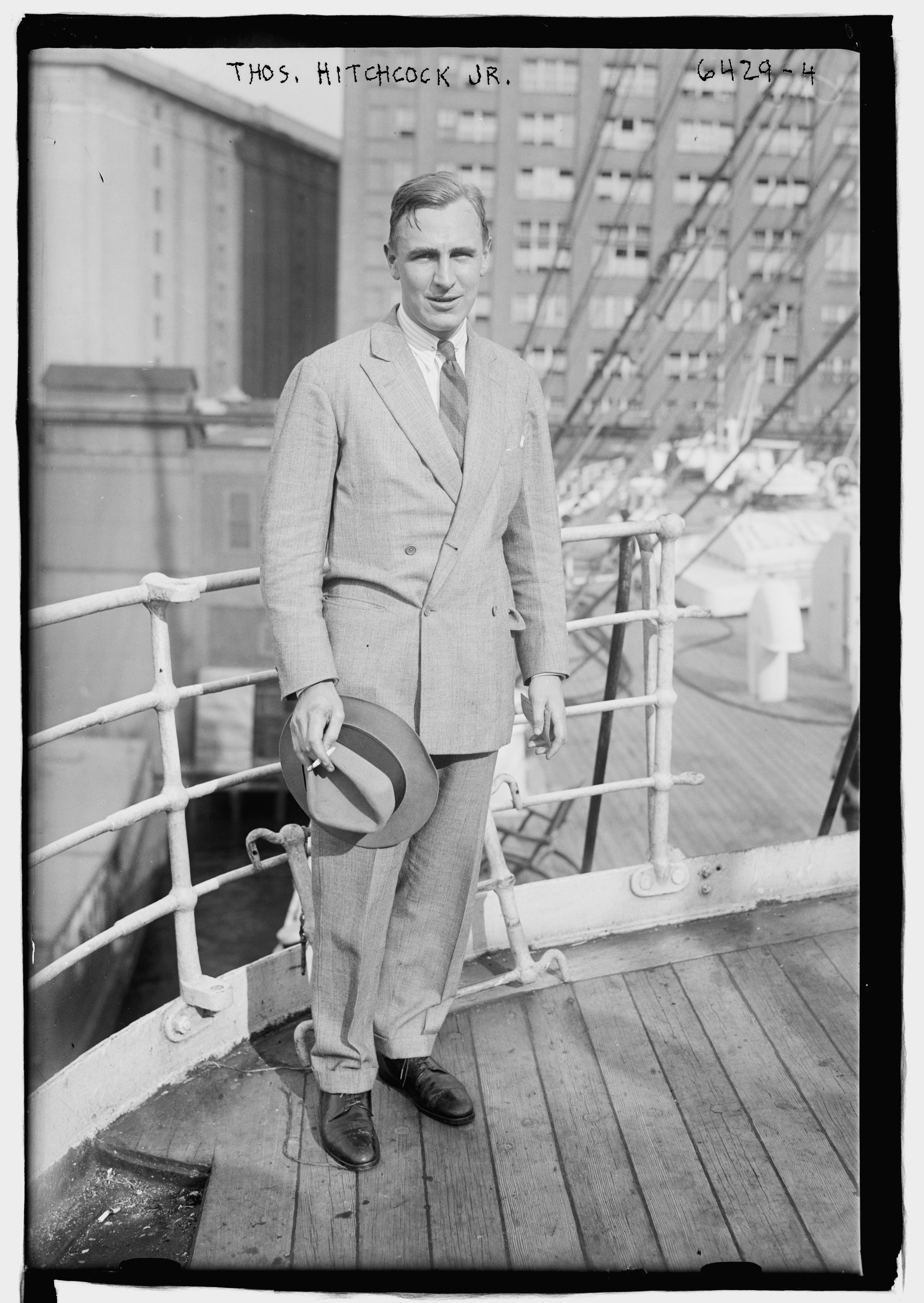
- Born: Thomas Hitchcock Jr. February 11, 1900; Aiken, South Carolina, U.S.
- Died: April 18, 1944 (aged 44); Salisbury, Wiltshire, England
- Cause of death: Military test aircraft crash
- Resting place: Cambridge American Cemetery, Cambridgeshire, England
- Education: St. Paul's School, Harvard University, Oxford University
- Known for: Lafayette Flying Corps; Polo (10-goal handicap); P-51 Mustang development
- Board member of: Lehman Brothers
- Spouse: Margaret Lederle Mellon
- Children: 4
- Parent(s): Thomas Hitchcock Sr. Louise Mary Eustis

Medal record

Men's Polo

Representing the United States

Olympic Games
Silver medal – second place	1924 Paris	Team competition

Thomas Hitchcock Jr. (February 11, 1900 – April 18, 1944) was an American polo player and aviator who was killed in an air crash during World War II. He was inducted posthumously into the Polo Hall of Fame.

== Early years ==
Born in Aiken, South Carolina, Hitchcock learned the sport of polo from his parents, Louise and Thomas Hitchcock Sr. His father was a U.S. Racing Hall of Fame horse trainer who had been a 10-goal polo player and helped found the Meadowbrook Polo Club on Long Island, New York, and who captained the American team in the inaugural 1886 International Polo Cup. Hitchcock played in his first tournament at age 13 and was part of the Meadowbrook Polo Club team that won the 1916 U.S. national junior championship.

Hitchcock attended St. Paul's School, where he played football, and hockey and was a crew team member. After being elected president of the Sixth Form, Hitchcock chose to leave school and join the Lafayette Flying Corps in France during World War I. He was shot down and captured by the Germans, but he escaped by jumping out of a train. He then hid in the woods during the daytime and walked more than one hundred miles over eight nights to the safety of Switzerland. After the war, Hitchcock studied at Harvard University and Oxford University.

== Polo career ==
Hitchcock led the U.S. team to victory in the 1921 International Polo Cup. From 1922 to 1940, Hitchcock carried a 10-goal handicap, which is the highest ranking in polo, from the United States Polo Association. Playing with notable stars such as Pete Bostwick, Jock Whitney and Gerald Balding, he led teams to U.S. National Open Championships in 1923, 1927, 1935 and 1936.

== Marriage and later life ==
On December 15, 1928, Hitchcock married Margaret Lederle "Peggy" Mellon (1901–1998), the younger daughter of businessman William Larimer Mellon, in New York City. They had four children together – daughters Louise Eustis Hitchcock and Margaret Mellon Hitchcock, and twin sons Thomas Hitchcock III and William Mellon Hitchcock.

For several years, Hitchcock was employed in New York by venture capitalist and socialite George Gordon Moore. He also coached a notable polo team (including W. Averell Harriman), known as the San Carlos Cardinals, at Moore's Rancho San Carlos (now the Santa Lucia Preserve) in Carmel, California. In 1937, with fellow polo player Robert Lehman, Hitchcock became a partner in the Lehman Brothers investment firm.

Serving as a lieutenant colonel in the United States Army Air Forces during World War II, Hitchcock was assigned as an assistant air attaché to the U.S. Embassy in London, England. In that capacity, he was instrumental in the development of the P-51 Mustang fighter plane, particularly in replacing the original Allison engine with the Packard-built Rolls-Royce Merlin. Hitchcock was killed while piloting one such aircraft near Salisbury in Wiltshire, when he was unable to pull out of a dive while doing tests. His death was reported to his family by fellow St. Paul's alumnus John G. Winant, then serving as United States Ambassador to the United Kingdom.

== Legacy ==
Author F. Scott Fitzgerald modeled two characters in his books on Hitchcock – Tom Buchanan in The Great Gatsby (1925) and the Tommy Barban character in Tender Is the Night (1934).

Following its formation, Hitchcock was inducted posthumously into the Polo Hall of Fame in 1990. He had played on teams that won the International Polo Cup several times during the 1920s and 1930s (see Big Four).

Three of Hitchcock's children – Margaret, Thomas and William – loaned the Hitchcock Estate in Millbrook, New York, to Timothy Leary from 1963 to 1968, and it became a nexus of the psychedelic movement of that decade.
