= Earle Hopping =

American polo player

Earle Wayne Hopping (October 31, 1882 - January 1963) was an American polo player. He played for the United States in the 1930 International Polo Cup. In that year the American side won the series 10-5 and 14-9. He also had an intercollegiate indoor polo cup named after him which was played by West Point against the Yale University Bulldogs and which ended in a 9 1/2 to 3 victory for West Point.

== Biography ==
He was born on October 31, 1882, in Lebanon, Ohio, to Ellery Hopping. He died in January 1963.
