= Frederick Whitfield Barrett =

British polo player

Olympic medal record

Men's Polo
Gold medal – first place	1920 Antwerp	polo
Bronze medal – third place	1924 Paris	polo

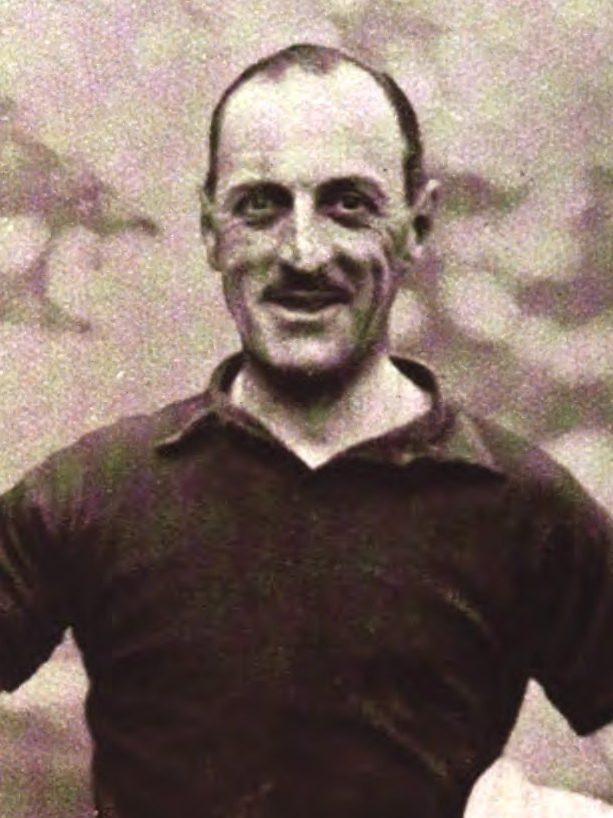
F. W. Barrett in 1921

Major Frederick Whitfield Barrett (20 June 1875 – 7 November 1949) was an international polo player. He trained race horses for three British Monarchs George V, Edward VIII and George VI.

== Biography ==
He was born on 20 June 1875 at the Barrett family home in Ireland, Silver Spring House in Lota Beg townland in County Cork. The Barrett family also resided at Hastings House in Barbados.

Barrett was in the 15th Hussars and had been a successful steeplechase rider. He began polo when his regiment went to India in 1902.

He competed on the England polo team in the 1914 and 1921 International Polo Cup. The English team were victorious in 1914 ending a series of losses.

He won the Roehampton Trophy for polo in 1919.

Barrett competed for Great Britain in polo at the 1920 Summer Olympics in Antwerp. The British Polo team defeated Spain in the final to win the gold medal. He also competed in polo at the 1924 Summer Olympics in Paris, where he received the bronze medal.

On leaving the Army, Barrett trained race horses. He trained Annandale, owned by Lady Glenapp, to finish third in the 1931 Grand National and to win the Scottish Grand National at Bogside the following month.

He died on 7 November 1949.

== Private life ==
Barrett was married to Honorable Isobel Caroline, Lord Kensington's daughter. The two of them lived at Wroughton Hall, Wiltshire.
