= Gurnee Munn =

American veteran and businessman

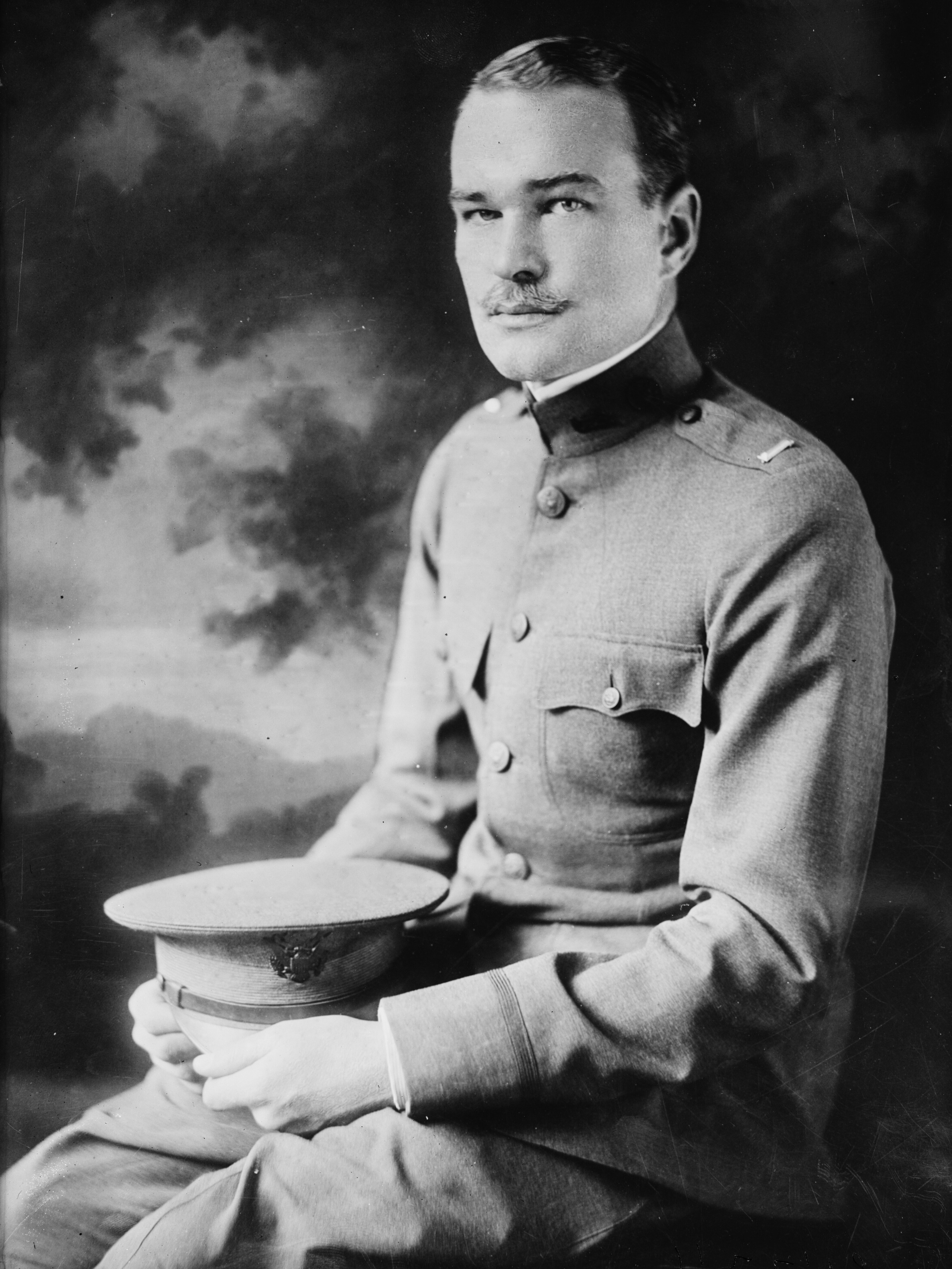
- Munn c. 1918

President of American Totalisator Company
- In office 1950–1955

Vice President and Treasurer of American Totalisator Company
- In office 1931–1950

Personal details
- Born: April 30, 1887 Washington, DC
- Died: May 7, 1960 (aged 73) Palm Beach, Florida
- Spouse: Marie Louise Wanamaker (m. 1915; div. 1933)
- Children: 2
- Education: Harvard University (1911)

Gurnee Munn (April 30, 1887 - May 7, 1960) was a businessman, president of the American Totalisator Company and former member of the New York Stock Exchange. He served in World War I and World War II.

== Biography ==
Munn married Marie Louise Wanamaker (1895–1955) of Philadelphia on June 28, 1915. Marie Louise was the daughter of Rodman Wanamaker and heir to the Wanamaker's department store fortune. The couple remained married until Marie Louise filed for divorce in 1933. The basis for the divorce was cruelty.

Munn was the father of two children, Fernanda and Gurnee, Jr.. Fernanda later married Lt. Francis L. Kellogg of the US Army. Gurnee Munn, Jr. first married Adrianna Manfredi, daughter of the Marchese and Marchesa Manfredi of Italy. That marriage ended in divorce in 1942. He later married Margaret Keohane of New York City in 1945.

Munn, a Washington, DC businessman, acquired the seat of Robert Johnson, Jr., on the New York Stock Exchange for $468,000 in June 1930. Mr. Munn was employed by W.R.K. Taylor & Co. at the time. Munn later sold his seat on the exchange to Francis Norris in November 1931.

After World War I, Munn founded the Palm Beach real estate firm of Munn, Hull & Boardman. After he left W.R.K. Taylor & Co. in 1931, he joined the American Totalalisator Co. as vice president and treasurer, a position he held until his death. He also served as president of the company from 1950 to 1955.

Munn died in his home in Palm Beach, Florida on May 7, 1960. He was 73 years of age.

== Memberships ==
He was a member of the Everglades Club of Palm Beach, the Brook Club of New York, the Racquet and Tennis Club of New York, the Bucks Club of London and the Travelers Club of Paris.
