= Nic Roldan =

American polo player and model (born 1982)

- Born: December 4, 1982 (age 43); Buenos Aires, Argentina
- Occupation: Professional polo player
- Years active: 1998-present
- Website: Official Website

Nicolas Ezequiel Roldan (born December 4, 1982) is an American polo player and model.

== Biography ==
=== Early life ===
He was born in Buenos Aires, Argentina. His father, Raul Roldan, is a polo player who played with the Sultan of Brunei, as was his grandfather. His mother is Dee Roldan, an interior designer. He has a sister, Lupe Roldan. He grew up in Wellington, Florida. He started playing polo at the age of five. He graduated from Cardinal Newman High School in West Palm Beach, Florida.

=== Polo career ===
He is an eight-goal polo player. He owns thirty polo ponies. Nic also retrains off the track thoroughbred horses (OTTBs) to use as polo ponies.

In 1998, at the age of fifteen, the Escue team he played on, together with Sebastien Merlos, Juan I. Merlos and Stuart Erskine, won the U.S. Open Polo Championship. The following year, in 1999, he was named polo's Young Player of the Year.

In 2010, he was captain on the polo team of Prince Harry at the Veuve Clicquot Polo Classic on Governors Island.

On July 28, 2013, Equus & Co sponsored United States team he played on, together with Polito Pieres, Marc Ganzi and Mike Azzaro, lost the Westchester Cup in overtime.

=== Modeling career ===
He has been a model for Wilhelmina Models. He has also represented Piaget SA, the watch-maker. He also appeared on Kourtney and Kim Take Miami, where he taught polo to Kourtney Kardashian and Kim Kardashian.

=== Personal life ===
He has six tattoos.
