= Mark Tomlinson =

English polo player

Mark Tomlinson (born 25 March 1982) is a professional polo player who plays for the England polo team, with a handicap of seven goals in Britain and six in Argentina.

== Biography ==
Tomlinson, whose parents Simon and Claire own the Beaufort Polo Club, was born into a family of polo players in Gloucestershire and was educated at Marlborough and the University of the West of England (UWE), Bristol with a degree in Spanish. He has an older brother and a sister, both of whom are international polo players. Sister Emma is an amateur with a two-goal handicap, and brother Luke served as captain of the England team with a seven goals handicap in Britain.

Tomlinson made his first start for England in 2005. He and his brother played with James Beim and Malcolm Borwick on the England team and won the Cartier International 2008 at Guards Polo Club, 10–9, against Australia. Tomlinson captained and won the St. Regis International Test Match at Cowdray Park Polo Club against Italy and the Williams De Broe Test Match at Beaufort Polo Club against New Zealand. In the Queen's Cup 2008, he played for the Apes Hill Team and won the Vivari Cup Subfinal against team Grayshurst. Tomlinson also took part in the Argentina Polo Tour 2008, playing for the team Twelve Oaks and he was the team captain at the New Zealand Test Match, which was played in Kihikihi Polo Club on 9 February. Tomlinson has competed in the International Polo Cup three times, in the 2009, 2013, and 2023 editions.

On 27 August 2012, Tomlinson was engaged to German-born British dressage rider Laura Bechtolsheimer. The couple married in the Swiss resort of Arosa on 2 March 2013. They have three children (Annalisa, Wilfred and Hanni) and were expecting a fourth as of 2021.

== Controversies ==
In 2024, he was accused of being involved in a money laundering network, headed by Alessandro Bazzoni and Siri Evjemo-Nysveen, dedicated to the purchase of polo horses with money from corruption in the Venezuelan oil company PDVSA through the companies CGC One Planet and Clareville Grove Capital.
