= Eric G. Atkinson =

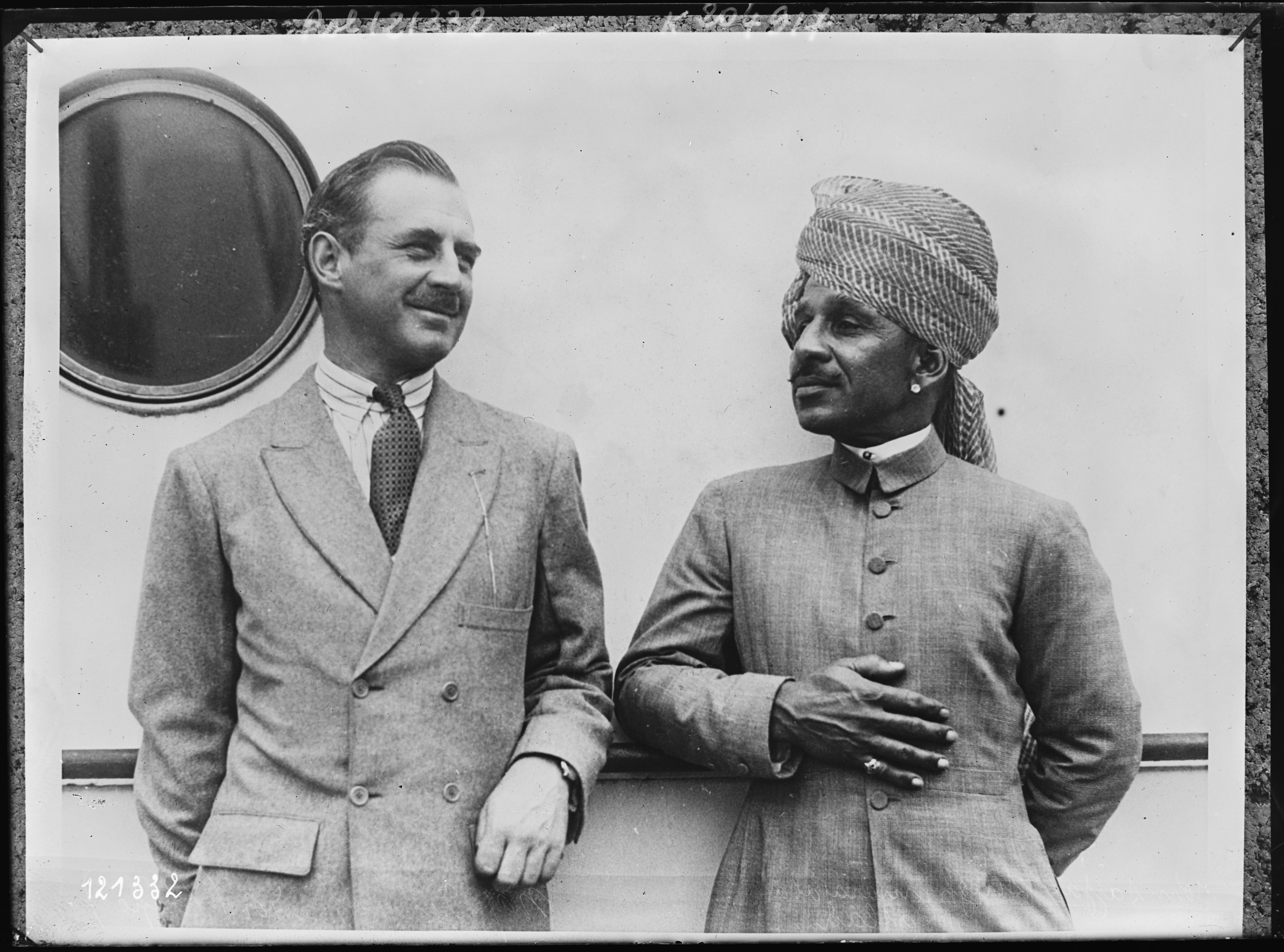
Eric G. Atkinson and Sajjan Singh of Ratlam in 1927

Colonel Eric Garnett Atkinson MVO, (9 April 1887 – 1955) was a British-Indian soldier and an India 9-goal polo player. He competed in the 1924 and 1927 International Polo Cup.

== Biography ==
He was born on 9 April 1887 in Bareilly, India as the son of Brigadier-General Francis Garnett Atkinson, C. B., and Eliza Augusta Snow Prestage. He commanded the 17th Cavalry between 1902 and 1906.

He was educated at Reading School and the Royal Military College, Sandhurst, from which he was commissioned onto the Unattached List for the Indian Army on 19 January 1907.

Attached 1st Battalion West Yorkshire Regiment in India, 16 March 1907.

Appointed to Indian Army 16 March 1908 and joined the 17th Cavalry 26 March 1908.

Promoted Lieutenant 19 April 1909.

Attended the 1911 Coronation as part of the Indian Army contingent. He was personally presented with his coronation medal by the King.

Aide De Camp to the Governor of Madras 1912-13.

He played polo before the war with a polo team called the Indian Tigers with Count Jean de Madre.

Served France & Belgium 22 August 1914 to 14 March 1918.

Mentioned in Dispatches London Gazette 28 December 1917.

Served with 15th Kings Hussars, 5th Royal Irish Lancers, 36th Jacob's Horse and Cavalry Signal's.

Promoted Captain 19 January 1916.

Antedated promotion to Captain 1 September 1915.

In 1916 he married Olive Marion Cole, daughter of John Cole, Q.C. They had one son, Denis Cary, born 19 November 1916.

Acting Major 25 January 1920 to 17 March 1920 whilst second in command 2/90th Punjabis.

For services during the Afghanistan NWF 1919 operations he was Mentioned in Dispatches.

For services during the Waziristan 1920-21 operations he was Mentioned in Dispatches.

Transferred to the 15th Lancers 16 February 1922 from 17th Cavalry when it amalgamated with the 37th Lancers to form the 15th Lancers.

Promoted Major 19 January 1922.

In May 1923 he was also officially handicapped at 8 points.

Commanding Governor-General's (or Viceroy's) Bodyguard January 1922 to October 1927.

Played Polo for England in 1924 and 1927 against the United States.

It was decided for the first post-war international match with America for the Westchester Cup that the Hurlingham Club should be represented by a team from the Army in India. This decision was prompted not only by reason of the lack of players then in England, but doubtless also by the high standard already attained by many Indian Cavalry players.

Appointed Squadron Commander, 15th Lancers 1 December 1925.

Appointed second in command 15th Lancers 30 August 1931

Promoted Lieutenant-Colonel 19 January 1933.

Appointed to command 15th Lancers 4 April 1934.

Appointed MVO (4th class) in the Kings Birthdays honors.

In December 1934 he was officially handicapped at 7 points.

Awarded both the 1935 Jubilee and 1937 Coronation medals.

In March 1937 the 15th Lancers won both the Indian Cavalry Tournament and the Inter-Regimental.

Relinquished command 8 April 1937.

Retired 9 October 1937.

Re-employed during the Second World War, reverting to the rank of Major 1 July 1940.

Major (A/Lt-Col) reverted to the rank of Lt-Col 5 June 1941.

Appointed Acting Colonel 23 June 1941

Released from the Indian Regular Reserve of Officers and ceased to be employed 19 February 1945 and granted the honorary rank of Colonel.

Re-employed during World War II first with 1 Commando Brigade with the rank of Colonel and from 1944 onwards with the Home Guard Training Staff. After his release in 1945 he served with the British Red Cross and St. John War Organization in North-West Europe.

He was a polo umpire after the war.

In 1951 he lived at Newstead, Instow, North Devon.

Died 16 April 1955
