= Herbert Haydon Wilson =

British polo player

Olympic medal record

Men's Polo
Gold medal – first place	1908 London	Team competition

Herbert Haydon Wilson, DSO (14 February 1875 – 11 April 1917) was a British officer and polo player who competed in the 1908 Summer Olympics.

== Biography ==
Wilson was the youngest son of Sir Samuel Wilson, of Victoria, Australia.

He was commissioned a lieutenant in the Sherwood Rangers (Nottinghamshire Yeomanry) on 25 December 1895. Following the outbreak of the Second Boer War in late 1899, Wilson volunteered to serve in South Africa, and was in February 1900 appointed a lieutenant of the Imperial Yeomanry, where he served with the 3rd Battalion from 1900 to 1901 (twice Mentioned in Despatches). In March 1901, he was appointed a Companion of the Distinguished Service Order (DSO) for gallantry in defence of posts in the Boer attack on Lichtenburg. Promoted to a captain, he relinquished his commission with the 3rd Battalion on 18 July 1901 and was granted the honorary rank of captain in the Army. He received the substantive rank of captain in the Sherwood Rangers on 20 December 1902.

In the 1908 Olympics, he was a member of the British polo team Roehampton, which won the gold medal.

In 1911, he was an investor in J.M.P.F.W. Ltd., the company behind the Parker expedition to Jerusalem, who were looking for the Ark of the Covenant. His brothers Clarence Wilson and Gordon Chesney Wilson both went on the expedition.

Wilson was killed in action at age 42 during the First World War, serving as a captain with the Royal Horse Guards near Arras in the Second Battle of Arras. He was killed on the 11th April 1917 near the village of Monchy-le-Preux. Four regiments of the 3rd Cavalry Division were sent forward to exploit an anticipated breakthrough. They were the Royal Horse Guards, the 10th Hussars, and the Essex Yeomanry. They rode through a snowstorm to the frontline north of the village. There, they were met by deadly machine-gun fire and shelling and dismounted to create a defensive line. The cavalrymen took cover but had to tether their horses where they fought. Six hundred cavalrymen and many more horses became casualties. It was in this action that Herbert Wilson died, defending the small village against a German counter-attack. He was buried in the Faubourg D'Amiens Cemetery nearby.

== See also ==
- List of Olympians killed in World War I
