= Tim Melvill =

English polo player (1877-1951)

Olympic medal record

Men's Polo
Gold medal – first place	1920 Antwerp	polo

Teignmouth Philip Melvill (13 February 1877 – 12 December 1951) was an English champion polo player.

== Biography ==
Melvill was the son of Teignmouth Melvill, a recipient of the Victoria Cross.

He played for England against the United States in the 1924 International Polo Cup. He played in the number 1 position.

Melvill competed for Great Britain in the 1920 Summer Olympics at Antwerp. The British Polo Team defeated Spain in the final to win the gold medal. He died on 12 December 1951.
