= Henry Archdale Tomkinson =

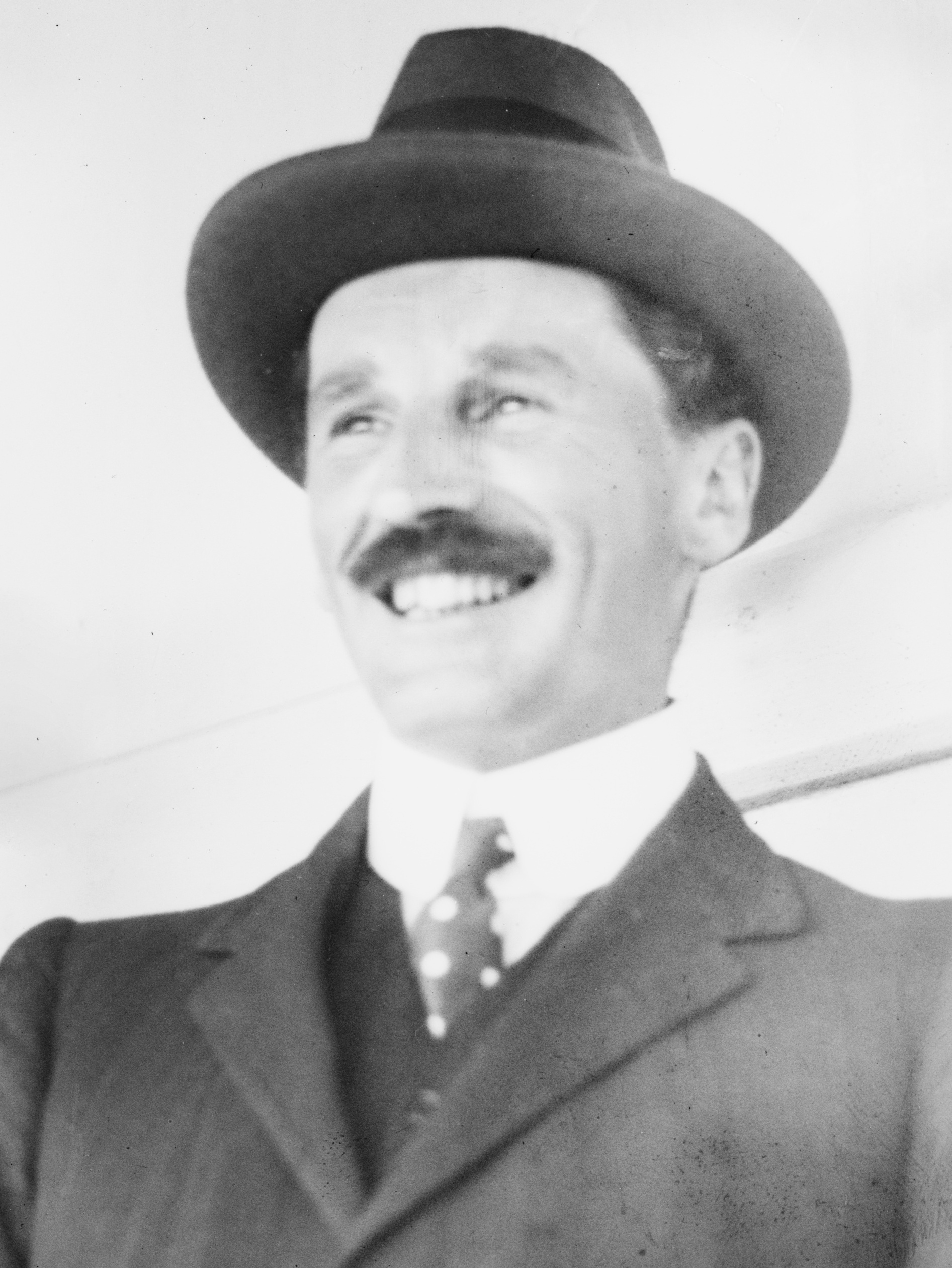
Tomkinson in 1914

Brigadier Henry Archdale Tomkinson DSO* (1881 – 21 January 1937) was a British Army officer and polo champion. He was captain of the team that won the 1914 and 1921 International Polo Cup. In 1927 he was the team manager for the International Polo Cup game.

Tomkinson was commissioned a second lieutenant in the 1st (Royal) Dragoons on 8 January 1901, and promoted to lieutenant on 27 June 1901. He served with his regiment in South Africa during the Second Boer War. Following the end of the war, he left South Africa with other officers and men of the regiment on the SS Kildonan Castle, which arrived at Southampton in October 1902.

He died on 21 January 1937.
