= Leslie Cheape =

British soldier and polo player (1882–1916)

Leslie St. Clair Cheape
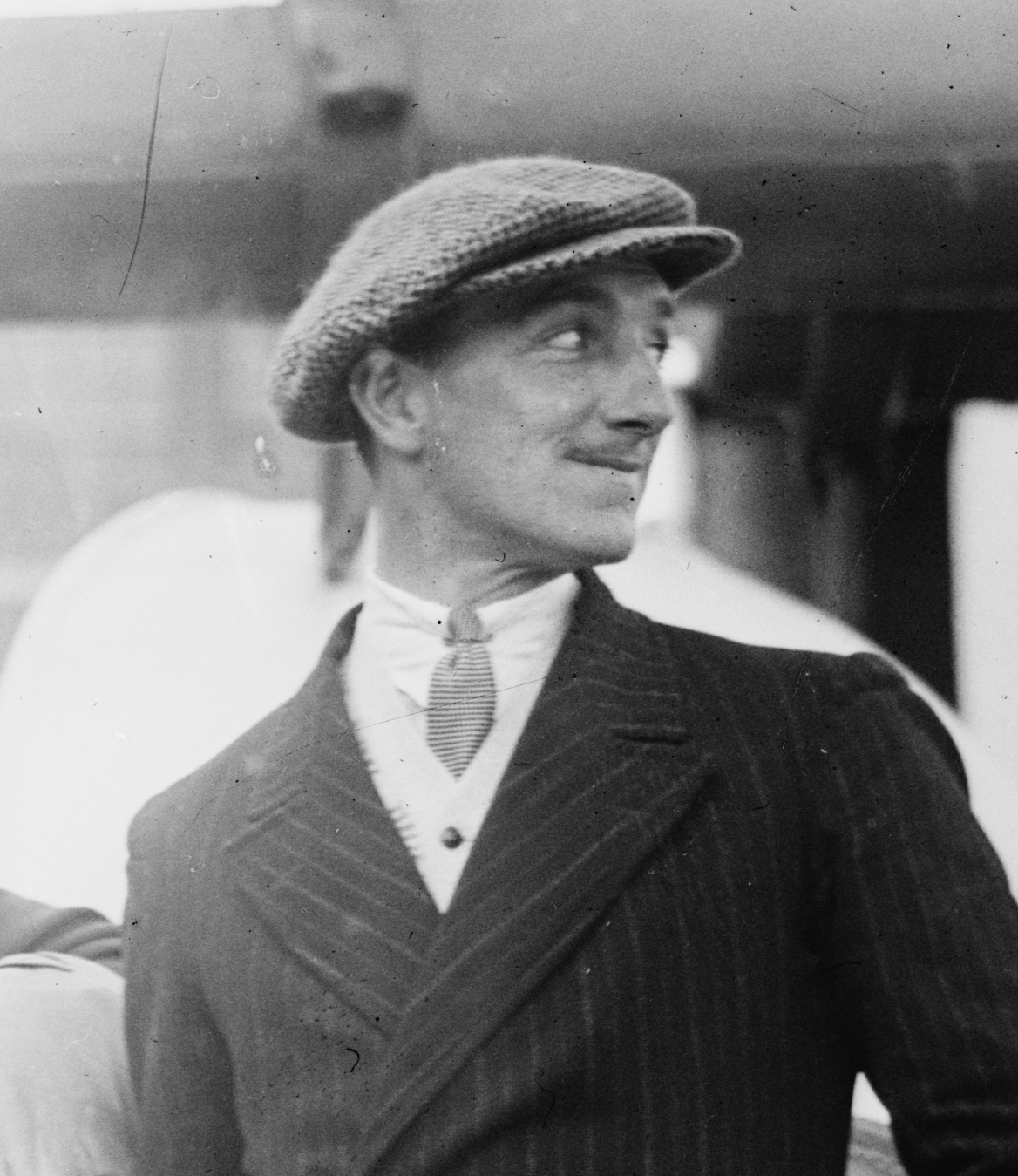
- Cheape in 1914

Personal information
- Born: 1882 Scotland, United Kingdom
- Died: 23 April 1916 (aged 33–34) Palestine, Ottoman Empire
- Military career
- Branch: British Army
- Rank: Major
- Unit: 1st King's Dragoon Guards
- Conflict: World War I

Sport
- Country: United Kingdom
- Sport: Polo

Leslie St. Clair Cheape (1882–1916) was a British soldier and polo player in the 1910s.

== Personal life ==
Leslie St. Clair Cheape was born in 1882 Scotland, the third son of Maude Mary Cheape, "of Wellfield, Fife, and Bentley Manor, Worcestershire." His sister—C. B. Cay—died aboard RMS Empress of Ireland on 29 May 1914.

== Military ==
Cheape was assigned to the British Army's Argyll and Sutherland Highlanders in the British Raj in 1905 when he was transferred to the 1st King's Dragoon Guards. By 1911, Cheape held the rank of captain. In 1916, while deployed during World War I, then-Major Cheape died in Palestine on 23 April 1916.

== Polo ==
Cheape began playing polo in the British Raj while stationed there with the British Army. In July 1907, Cheape played for the Tigers at the Leamington Tournament, emerging victorious and taking home the cup after defeating Kibworth Grange (4 to 3), Old Cantabs (3 to 2), and the Tally Ho's.

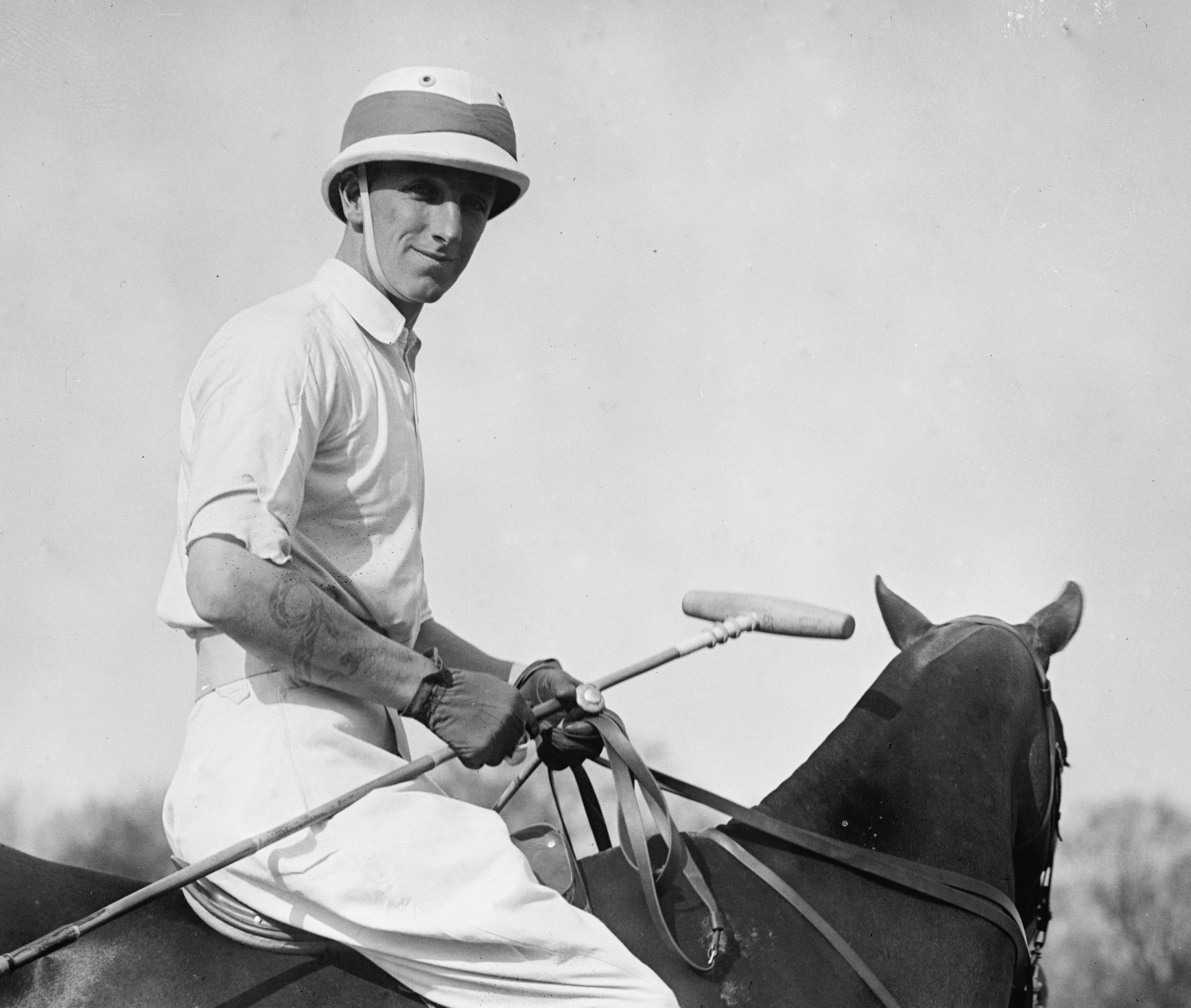
Cheape on horseback in 1911

In April 1911, Cheape arrived in the United States to compete for the United Kingdom of Great Britain and Ireland in the International Polo Cup. At a practice match in May, the Britons lost to the Americans—1 1/4 to 11 1/4—so John Hardress-Lloyd moved Cheape to a forward position. The first match of the cup went to the home team (4 1/2 to Britain's 3); Cheape was contemporaneously described as "the worst mounted man on the field". Though George V's team would also lose the second match (and the cup), the contest was called "the finest game of polo ever seen […] Every man on the field played up to the top of his form, not a weak link on either side."

When Cheape returned to the States in 1913 to play in that year's International Polo Cup, he was "at the top of his form" in practices at the Piping Rock Club. Nevertheless, Britain's team lost their first match (with 3 to 5 1/2 goals), as well as their second (with 4 1/4 to 4 1/2). After being chosen by Ivor Guest, 1st Viscount Wimborne in May 1914 to play in that year's cup at Meadowbrook, Cheape scored three of Britain's 8 1/2 winning goals (to the US' three), though not without receiving a black eye and a broken nose in the process. The second match was postponed by the Americans for three days to allow Cheape to recover from his injuries; when they finally took to the field, the match went to the UK team (4 to 2 3/4), and the Westchester Cup returned with Cheape and his team to Great Britain.

One hundred years after his first swing at the International Cup, Cheape was still remembered as "one of the greatest [British polo players] ever".
