= James Beim =

English polo player

- Born: James; 8 April 1980 (age 46); Nuneaton
- Other name: Beimy
- Occupation: Polo player
- Known for: England Captain
- Spouse: Lauren Patricia Beim

James Beim (born 8 April 1980) is an English polo player. He is the captain of the England Polo Team.

== Biography ==
=== Early life ===
He learned how to play polo at the North Cotswold Pony Club.

=== Career ===
He has won the Prince of Wales Cup, the Queen’s Cup aged 22, and the Cowdray Gold Cup. Moreover, in September 2012, he won the French Open at the Polo Club du Domaine de Chantilly in France. He is sponsored by Audi and Casablanca Polo.

In 2014, he was appointed as the captain of the England Polo Team, replacing Luke Tomlinson.

== Controversies ==
In 2024, he was accused of being involved in a money laundering network, headed by Alessandro Bazzoni and Siri Evjemo-Nysveen, dedicated to the purchase of polo horses with money from corruption in the Venezuelan oil company PDVSA through the companies CGC One Planet and Clareville Grove Capital.
