= Luke Tomlinson =

English polo player (born 1977)

- Born: 1977 (age 48–49)
- Occupation: Polo player
- Parent(s): Simon & Claire Tomlinson

Luke Tomlinson is a professional polo player and former captain of the England polo team, with a handicap of seven goals in Britain and eight in Argentina.

== Biography ==
Tomlinson, who along with his family owns the Beaufort Polo Club, was born into a family of polo players in Gloucestershire and was educated at Eton and Trinity College, Cambridge. He has a younger brother and a sister, both of whom are international polo players (Emma as an amateur with a two-goal handicap, and Mark Tomlinson, a professional with a seven-goal handicap in Britain).

He is one of the top polo players in Britain. So far, he has won the Queen's Cup, Gold Cup and the Coronation Cup. Tomlinson is playing in England, Spain and Argentina. He took part in the qualifications for the Campeonato Argentino Abierto de Polo 2008 (Argentine Open) with his team Alegría Park Hyatt, but lost against the El Paraiso team.

Luke courted controversy in 2004 when he, along with Otis Ferry and six other pro-hunt protesters, stormed the House of Commons in protest at anti-hunting legislation. All eight were convicted of violating the Public Order Act, were each fined £350 and given 18-month conditional discharges.
