= Devereux Milburn =

American champion polo player

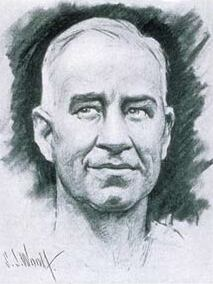
- Cover of Time magazine, September 5, 1927

Personal information
- Born: September 19, 1881 Buffalo, New York, U.S.
- Died: August 15, 1942 (aged 60) Westbury, New York, U.S.
- Resting place: Locust Valley Cemetery, Locust Valley, New York, U.S.
- Occupations: Lawyer, polo player

Horse racing career
- Sport: Horse racing

Major racing wins
- Westchester Cup (1909, 1911, 1913, 1921, 1924, 1927)

Honours
- Cover of Time magazine (September 5, 1927); Inducted into the National Polo Hall of Fame (1990)

Devereux Milburn (September 19, 1881 – August 15, 1942) was an American champion polo player in the early to mid twentieth century. He was one of a group of Americans known as the Big Four in international polo, winning the Westchester Cup six times. He is "remembered as possibly the best polo player this country ever produced." His given name has been alternatively spelled as "Devereaux" in some publications.

== Early life ==
Milburn was born September 19, 1881, in Buffalo, New York. He was the son of New York lawyer and politician John George Milburn, born in England, and Mary Patty Stocking, a teacher and the daughter of farmers in Wyoming County, New York. He had two younger brothers, John G. Milburn Jr., born in 1882; and Ralph, born in 1888.

His father, a lawyer with the firm of Carter Ledyard & Milburn, was notably the chairman of the Pan-American Exposition in Buffalo in 1901, where President William McKinley was fatally shot by an assassin. McKinley was taken to the Milburn family home, where he died. Devereux Milburn was not present at the time.

Milburn entered Lincoln College, Oxford in 1899 alongside his brother John George Milburn Jr., where he gained a rowing blue. He was also on the university swimming team. Thirdly, he guided the Oxford University Polo team to victory in successive Varsity matches, winning by a margin of 14 goals on both occasions. He sometimes swam competitively and played polo against the same university on the same day.

== Career ==
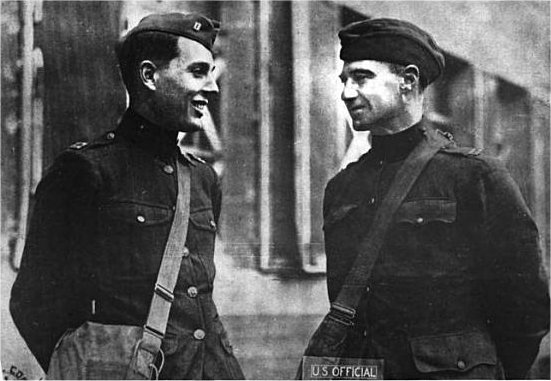
Milburn (left) and C.F. Holmes in 1917 at Chatel-Chéhéry.

During World War I, Milburn served as a major in the field artillery in France. He served as an Aide-de-camp for Major-General James H. McRae at Chatel-Chéhéry in 1917. He later practiced law at his father's firm Carter Ledyard & Milburn. His brother John G. Milburn Jr. also went into law.

Milburn was one of the Big Four who played polo internationally against the United Kingdom in the early 20th century. He participated on teams that won the Westchester Cup six times. He is "remembered as possibly the best polo player this country ever produced."

Milburn was featured on the cover of Time magazine on September 5, 1927, and was referenced in an article on the upcoming polo season in that edition.

== Personal life ==
On November 1, 1913, Milburn was married to Nancy Gordon Steele (1894–1955) in the little stone Church of the Advent in Westbury on Long Island. Nancy, a Chapin School graduate, was the daughter of Charles Steele, a partner in J. P. Morgan and Company, and a sister of Kathryne Nevitt Steele (the wife of Francis Skiddy von Stade Sr.) and Eleanor Steele (the wife of Hall Clovis and Emmet P. Reese). Together, Nancy and Dev were the parents of two daughters and two sons:

- Nancy Gordon Milburn (1914–1952), who married Arthur Delano Weekes Jr. (1908–1981) in 1938.
- Katharyn S. Milburn, a Vassar College graduate who married Lorenzo Taylor, and lived in Buenos Aires, Argentina.
- Devereux Milburn Jr. (1917–2000), who married Elizabeth Clarke Hinckley (1913–2005). He also attended Lincoln College, Oxford and was a sportsman who became a Wall Street lawyer.
- John Milburn (1918–1942), who married Ruth Harris in 1941. He became a combat pilot in World War II, and died in an airplane crash in Virginia in December 1942, four months after his father's death. After his death, his widow remarried to Capt. Gaston Meredith Fox.

Milburn's main residence was in Old Westbury, New York, on Long Island. Called Sunridge Hall, it was built on the North Shore near his in-laws' estate. Milburn also maintained a residence at 627 Magnolia St. in Aiken, SC in the Gilded Age Aiken Winter Colony. The Aiken Winter Colony was at the nexus of the start of polo in the United States and was a primary center for polo in the early 1900s.

Milburn died on August 15, 1942, at the age of 60 of a heart attack, while playing golf at the Meadowbrook Polo Club in Westbury, Long Island.

== In popular culture ==
Paul Auster's true-story collection, True Tales of American Life, includes a work about a visit by Milburn's son John and two Air Force colleagues to the family home on Long Island. The story was first featured on NPR's National Story Project on All Things Considered.
