= Meadowbrook Polo Club =

Coordinates: 40.8105798°N 73.5978714°W

Meadow Brook Polo Club
Chairmen	Robert C. Ceparano
Club Professional & Manager	Juan Redlich
Club PR & Sponsorship	Keeper of the Brand

The Meadowbrook Polo Club (originally styled as the "Meadow Brook Club"), located in Old Westbury, New York, is the oldest continuously operating polo club in the United States, first established in 1881.

== Early days ==
The Meadow Brook Club was established in 1881, and for the first several years matches were played on the racetrack at the Mineola Fairgrounds, before opening its own facility, including a field and clubhouse, in 1884. Originally located in the town of Westbury, New York, the new venue was home to the United States National Open from 1923 to 1953. In 1928 the fields hosted the Cup of the Americas match between the United States and Argentina, which attracted more than 100,000 spectators over three days. In 1932, the club became the only non-Argentine club to win the Argentine Open Polo Championship. World War II caused a major reduction in activity, and in 1954 the club was razed for the construction of the Meadowbrook Parkway.

== New locations ==
The club was located for a brief time in Jericho, New York, before again being sold for development in 1968. In 1961 the name was contracted from "Meadow Brook" to "Meadowbrook". The club moved to a new location in Old Westbury and again hosted the United States Open in 1994 and 1995.
