= Oxford University Polo Club Varsity teams =

The Oxford University Polo Club has fielded Varsity teams against Cambridge University in the Varsity Polo Match since the competition was established in 1878. Members of the teams are traditionally known as Blues, with Oxford players specifically referred to as Dark Blues.

== History and eligibility ==
The original eligibility requirements and match conditions were recorded as follows:

No player eligible who has been a member of his University for more than four years, or who has not been in residence during the term in which the match takes place. Instituted in 1878. Played generally at Hurlingham, in June. (Modern Polo, 1896)

No player eligible who has been a member of his University for more than four years, or who has not been in residence during the term in which the match takes place. The Cup shall be held by the winning University in each year until May 1st in the succeeding year, when it shall be returned to The Hurlingham Club. Play – 6 periods. (The Polo Yearbook 1939)

Teams are selected from students of the university's various colleges. Women began participating in 1962, marking a significant development in the history of the competition. A formal rule change in 1963 subsequently permitted mixed-gender teams, a feature that remains relatively uncommon among Blues sports at Oxford and Cambridge.

== Statistics ==
=== Notable records ===
A selection of notable Varsity Match statistics includes:

- Highest team handicap (pre-World War II): +13 (1910)
- Highest team handicap (post-World War II): +6 (1972)
- Highest individual handicap (pre-World War II): +5, James Joseph Pearce (1910)
- Highest individual handicap (post-World War II): +4, Lanto Sheridan (2013)
- First female player: Claire Lucas (1964)
- First female team captain: Claire Lucas (1966)
- Number of teams captained by women: 4 out of 127 (1966, 1994, 2019 and 2024)

== Varsity teams by year ==
The following tables list Oxford's Varsity teams chronologically, with players arranged in their respective playing positions (1 to 4). Where available, the records include each player's college affiliation, team captaincy and polo handicap, ranging from −2 to +10.

== 1878–1889 ==
Year	Result	Team Members	Picture
1878	won	1 Walter Mc M. Kavanagh, Christ Church; 2 Audley Charles Miles, Brasenose, Captain; 3 James Henry Stock, Christ Church; 4 Herbert Chase Green-Price, Brasenose; 5 John Blundell Leigh, Christ Church	
1879	lost	1 John Blundell Leigh, Christ Church; 2 James Henry Stock, Christ Church, Captain; 3 John Grant Lawson, Christ Church; 4 Henry Arthur Hallam Farnaby Lennard, Christ Church; 5 John Ernest Stock, Christ Church, Goalkeeper	Drawing of the 1879 Varsity Match
1880	won	1 John Blundell Leigh, Christ Church, Captain; 2 Walter MacMurrough Kavanagh, Christ Church; 3 John Grant Lawson, Christ Church; 4 James Henry Stock, Christ Church; 5 Martin Thomas Kennard, Christ Church	
1881	lost	1 Charles Spencer Canning Boyle, Viscount Dungarvan, Christ Church; 2 John Blundell Leigh, Christ Church; 3 Henry Berkeley Portman, 3rd Viscount Portman, non-coll.; 4 Henry Arthur Hallam Farnaby Lennard, Christ Church	
1882	lost	1 Henry Berkeley Portman, 3rd Viscount Portman, non-coll.; 2 Douglas Haig, Brasenose; 3 John Cator of Woodbastwick Hall, Christ Church; 4 Charles Edward Nicholas Charrington, Christ Church; 5 J. Goslyn	
1883	won	1 Henry Berkeley Portman, 3rd Viscount Portman, non-coll.; 2 Douglas Haig, Brasenose; 3 Charles Trefusis, Christ Church; 4 Thomas Hitchcock, Brasenose	
1884	lost	1 Henry Berkeley Portman, 3rd Viscount Portman, non-coll.; 2 Douglas Haig, Brasenose; 3 John Cator of Woodbastwick Hall, Christ Church; 4 Charles Edward Nicholas Charrington, Christ Church; 5 J. Goslyn	
1885	won	1 Richard Lawson, Christ Church; 2 William Cavendish-Bentinck, 6th Duke of Portland; 3 Piers Alexander Hamilton Edgcumbe Viscount Valletort, Christ Church; 4 John Michael Fleetwood Fuller, 1st Baronet, Christ Church	
1886	won	1 Richard Lawson, Christ Church; 2 Lord William August Cavendish Bentinck, 6th Duke of Portland, Christ Church; 3 Piers Alexander Hamilton Edgcumbe Viscount Valletort, Christ Church; 4 James Lionel Dugdale, Christ Church	
1887	lost	1 Piers Edgcumbe Viscount Valletort, Christ Church; 2 John Michael Fleetwood Fuller, Christ Church; 3 George Dunston Timmis, Christ Church; 4 Egremont John Mills, Christ Church	
1888	lost	1 George Dunston Timmis, Christ Church; 2 Thomas Clarence Edward Goff, Christ Church; 3 James Augustus Grant, Christ Church; 4 Nathaniel Clayton Cockburn, Christ Church, Captain	
1889	lost	1 W. Hammer; 2 Thomas Reginald Hague Cook, Christ Church; 3 Thomas Clarence Edward Goff, Christ Church; 4 Nathaniel Clayton Cockburn, Christ Church, Captain	

== 1890–1899 ==
Year	Result	Team Members
1890	won	1 Keppel Pulteney, Christ Church, Captain; 2 Arthur Dugdale, Christ Church (+2); 3 Henry Leonard Campbell Brassey, Christ Church; 4 George Saville Clayton, University College
1891	won	1 Keppel Pulteney, Christ Church, Captain; 2 Arthur Dugdale, Christ Church (+2); 3 Roger William Giffard Tyringham, Christ Church; 4 George Saville Clayton, University College
1892	lost	1 Penn Curzon Sherbrooke, Christ Church; 2 Godfrey Nigel Everard Baring, Hertford; 3 Arthur Dugdale, Christ Church, Captain (+2); 4 Frederick Charles Graham Menzies, Christ Church
1893	lost	1 George Henry Clifford, New College; 2 Godfrey Nigel Everard Baring, Hertford, Captain; 3 Arthur Dugdale, Christ Church (+2); 4 Frederick Charles Graham Menzies, Christ Church
1894	-	not played
1895	lost	1 George Child Villiers, 8th Earl of Jersey, New College, Captain; 2 Patteson Womersley Nickalls, New College; 3 J. W. Dugdale; 4 Captain Hon. Reginald Ward, Christ Church
1896	lost	1 Captain Hon. Reginald Ward, Christ Church; 2 Patteson Womersley Nickalls, New College; 3 George Child Villiers, 8th Earl of Jersey, New College; 4 Hugh Brodie Cardwell, Magdalen
1897	won	1 George Child Villiers, 8th Earl of Jersey, New College; 2 Patteson Womersley Nickalls, New College; 3 Cecil Patteson Nickalls, New College; 4 Hugh Brodie Cardwell, Magdalen, Captain
1898	won	1 Captain Hon. Reginald Ward, Christ Church; 2 Hugh Brodie Cardwell, Magdalen, Captain; 3 Cecil Patteson Nickalls, New College; 4 Morres (Bobby) Nickalls, New College
1899	won	1 Edward William Hermon, Christ Church; 2 W. Nickalls; 3 Hugh Brodie Cardwell, Magdalen, Captain; 4 Percy Frederick Brassey, New College

== 1900–1909 ==
Year	Result	Team Members	Picture
1900	-	Match not played, Cambridge being unable to raise a team.	
1901	won	1 Waldorf Astor, New College; 2 Prince Rajendra Kumar of Couch Behar, Christ Church; 3 Charles William Reginald Duncombe, Earl of Feversham, Christ Church; 4 R. P. Wade-Palmer, Christ Church, Captain	Oxford Varsity Polo Team 1901
1902	won	1 Leonard H. Hardy, New College; 2 Devereux Milburn, Lincoln; 3 Ernest Burford Horlick, Christ Church; 4 Waldorf Astor, New College, Captain	
1903	won	1 Weetman Harold Pearson, 2nd Viscount Cowdray, Christ Church; 2 Thomas Charles Reginald (Tommy) Agar-Robartes, Christ Church; 3 Devereux Milburn, Lincoln; 4 Leonard H. Hardy, New College, Captain	Oxford Varsity Team 1903 on Varsity Day
1904	lost	1 Neil Primrose, New College; 2 Ralph Albert Brassey, New College; 3 Weetman Harold Pearson, 2nd Viscount Cowdray, Christ Church; 4 Leonard H. Hardy, New College, Captain	
1905	lost	1 Neil Primrose, New College; 2 Francis Vernon Willey, Baron Barnby, Magdalen; 3 Weetman Harold Pearson, 2nd Viscount Cowdray, Christ Church, Captain; 4 Ralph Albert Brassey, New College	
1906	won	1 Julian Walter Winans, Worcester; 2 Paul Winans, Exeter; 3 Frederick Cripps, 3rd Baron Parmoor, New College; 4 Francis Vernon Willey, Baron Barnby, Magdalen, Captain	mounted photographs with original calligraphy of the Oxford v Cambridge Polo Varsity 1906 Oxford University Polo Team 1906 Oxford and Cambridge polo players at Hurlingham (Varsity polo match 1906) Oxford University and Cambridge University polo players at Hurlingham (Varsity polo match 1906)
1907	lost	1 Robert Spear Hudson, Viscount Hudson, Magdalen; 2 G. R. Foster, Christ Church; 3 Ralph de Debon Faber, Exeter; 4 Alan John Lance Scott, Merton	
1908	lost	1 S. Fremantle; 2 Robert Spear Hudson, Viscount Hudson, Magdalen; 3 Hubert Sydney Loder, Magdalen; 4 John Leslie-Melville, Earl of Leven and Melville, Balliol	
1909	lost	1 Percy Voltelin Heath, Magdalen; 2 Hubert Sydney Loder, Magdalen; 3 Robert Spear Hudson, Viscount Hudson, Magdalen, Captain; 4 Archibald Vincent Shirley, Exeter (+2)	

== 1910–1919 ==
Year	Result	Team Members	Picture
1910	won	1 George Bampfylde, New College (+1); 2 Hubert Sydney Loder, Magdalen (+3); 3 Captain James Joseph Pearce, Worcester (+5); 4 Robert Spear Hudson, Viscount Hudson, Magdalen, Captain (+4)	Varsity Match 1910 Oxford University Varsity team 1910
1911	lost	1 Ralph de Lérisson Cazenove (+1); 2 Sir Sidney Herbert, 1st Baronet, Balliol (+2); 3 Jocelyn Hope Hudson, Magdalen (+2); 4 Percy Voltelin Heath, Magdalen, Captain (+1)	
1912	won	1 Rothesay Stuart Wortley, Balliol (0); 2 Percy Voltelin Heath, Magdalen, Captain (+1); 3 Albany "Barney" Kennett Charlesworth, Christ Church (+1); 4 Edward Frederick Lawson, 4th Baron Burnham, Balliol (0)	
1913	won	1 Geoffrey William Martin Lees, Christ Church; 2 Albany "Barney" Kennett Charlesworth, Christ Church (+1); 3 Rothesay Stuart Wortley, Balliol (0); 4 Edward Frederick Lawson, 4th Baron Burnham, Balliol (+1)	
1914	won	1 Prince Sergius Obolensky, Christ Church (+2); 2 Archibald Leslie-Melville, 13th Earl of Leven, Christ Church (+3); 3 Albany "Barney" Kennett Charlesworth, Christ Church, Captain (+3); 4 Alwyne Chadwyck "Hobber" Hobson, Magdalen (+1)	Oxford University Varsity Team 1914
1915- 1919	-	no Varsity Match taking place due to the First World War or its aftermath	

== 1920–1929 ==
Year	Result	Team Members	Picture
1920	lost	1 Charles Wilfrid Bennett, Trinity; 2 Edwin Vickerman Rutherford, Trinity; 3 Hugh Alastair Hamilton Fraser, Magdalen; 4 George Sheavyn Sale, New College; spare Allen Bathurst, Lord Apsley, Christ Church	Oxford University Polo Varsity team 1920
1921	lost	1 J. A. Borden, Trinity; 2 Edwin Vickerman Rutherford, Trinity; 3 E. Holland-Martin, Christ Church; 4 Percy Rivington Pyne Jr., New College	Oxford University Varsity Team 1921
1922	lost	1 H. H. Howard; 2 G. Carr-White, Christ Church; 3 E. Holland-Martin, Christ Church; 4 Viscount Francis Hastings, Christ Church	Varsity Match 1922, two Oxford polo players in the back Oxford University Varsity team 1922
1923	lost	1 Reginald Alfred Carr-White, St Catherine's, Captain; 2 Walter Morley Sale, New College; 3 Ralph John Hines, Christ Church; 4 James Townsend Pearce, Christ Church	Oxford University Varsity Polo team 1923
1924	won	1 Thomas Martin Hilder, Oriel; 2 Sir Ian Walker Bart, Christ Church; 3 Reginald Alfred Carr-White, St Catherine's; 4 Walter Morley Sale, New College, Captain	
1925	lost	1 R. Bradley-Martin, Christ Church (+2); 2 Thomas Martin Hilder, Oriel; 3 Reginald Alfred Carr-White, St Catherine's; 4 Sir Ian Walker Bart, Christ Church	Varsity Polo match 1925: Oxford, who lost by 2 goals to 8, get the ball in mid-field. Oxford University Polo Team 1925 Oxford University Polo Team 1925.
1926	lost	1 Edward Fitzhardinge Peyton Gage, Christ Church (+1); 2 Hugh Sidebottom, Christ Church; 3 E. Dugdale, Christ Church; 4 John Mortimer Schiff, New College	Oxford University Polo Team 1926
1927	won	1 R. J. Holland (+1); 2 Edward Fitzhardinge Peyton Gage, Christ Church, Captain (+1); 3 John Mortimer Schiff, New College (+1); 4 H. Bradley-Martin, Christ Church (+2)	
1928	lost	1 Nigel Dugdale, Christ Church; 2 William Astor, 3rd Viscount Astor, New College; 3 Humphrey Orme Clarke, Christ Church; 4 H. Bradley-Martin, Christ Church (+2)	Oxford Varsity Team 1928
1929	lost	1 John Pearson, 3rd Viscount Cowdray, Christ Church; 2 William Astor, 3rd Viscount Astor, New College (+2); 3 Humphrey Orme Clarke, Christ Church; 4 H. Bradley-Martin, Christ Church (+2)	

== 1930–1939 ==
Year	Result	Team Members	Picture
1930	lost	1 Oliver Sanderson Poole, Christ Church (0); 2 John "Weetman" Person, 3rd Viscount Cowdray, Christ Church, Captain (0); 3 John Lakin, New College (0); 4 Robert Vickris Taylor, Magdalen (0)	Winners of the annual Inter-University match at Hurlingham. Left to right: Mr. A. S. Poole, Hon. W. J. C. Pearson, Mr. J. Lakin and Mr. R. V. Taylor
1931	won	1 Oliver Sanderson Poole, Christ Church; 2 John "Weetman" Pearson, 3rd Viscount Cowdray, Christ Church, Captain (+1); 3 John Lakin, New College (+1); 4 Robert Vickris Taylor, Magdalen (0)	Winners of the annual Inter-University match at Hurlingham. Left to right: Mr. A. S. Poole, Hon. W. J. C. Pearson, Mr. J. Lakin and Mr. R. V. Taylor
1932	won	1 Oliver Sanderson Poole, Christ Church; 2 Lt. L. H. Rodgers, Christ Church (+3); 3 John "Weetman" Pearson, Christ Church, Captain (+1); 4 John Lakin, New College (+1)	Oxford wins 11-2 in 1932. Oxford University Polo Team winning the Varsity Polo Match 11-0
1933	won	1 Richard Alan Budgett, Christ Church; 2 Peter Montefiore Samuel, New College; 3 Lt. L. H. Rodgers, Christ Church, Captain (+3); 4 Charles Ingram Courtenay Wood, 2nd Earl of Halifax, Christ Church (0)	Oxford University Varsity team 1933
1934	won	1 George John Charles Mercer-Nairne, 8th Marquess of Lansdowne, Christ Church; 2 Richard Gustavus Hamilton-Russell, Christ Church; 3 Richard Alan Budgett, Christ Church; 4 Charles Ingram Courtenay Wood, Christ Church, Captain (0)	Oxford Varsity Team 1934. Hurlingham Polo Grounds, London. Lady Halifax presents the Inter-University Cup to her son Charles Wood, captain of Oxford's victorious Varsity team in 1934.
1935	lost	1 Peter Murray Kemp-Gee, Oriel (0); 2 Arthur Maitland Budgett, Christ Church (+1); 3 Richard Alan Budgett, Christ Church, Captain; 4 Denis Frederick Little, New College (+1)	Oxford lost 4-5 in 1935
1936	won	1 Denis Frederick Little, New College (+1); 2 Peter Murray Kemp-Gee, Oriel (0); 3 Arthur Maitland Budgett, Christ Church, Captain (+1); 4 Devereux Milburn Jr., Lincoln (0)	Oxford University Varsity team 1936
1937	won	1 John Errol Mansfield, Christ Church (0); 2 John David Summers, Christ Church (0); 3 Arthur Maitland Budgett, Christ Church, Captain (+1); 4 Peter Murray Kemp-Gee, Oriel (+1)	
1938	won	1 John Errol Mansfield, Christ Church (0); 2 John Jacob ("Jackie") Astor, New College; 3 John David Summers, Christ Church (0); 4 Nicholas Hyde Villiers, New College	Oxford University Polo Team 1938
1939	lost	1 George Haig, Christ Church; 2 Edmund I. Percy Marsden, Christ Church; 3 Philip Profumo, Magdalen; 4 Gavin Astor, New College	Oxford Varsity team 1939

== 1940–1949 ==
Year	Team Members
1940-1949	no Varsity match taking place due to the Second World War and its aftermath

== 1950–1959 ==
Year	Result	Team Members	Pictures
1950	-	no Varsity match due to the aftermath of the Second World War	
1951	won	1 Timothy Ian Dale-Harris, Trinity (-2); 2 Timothy Wentworth Beaumont, Baron Beaumont of Whitley, Christ Church (-2); Hon. George Bertram Bathurst, Trinity (-2); 3 Thomas Michael Baring, Christ Church, Captain (-2); 4 Vivian Naylor-Leyland, 3rd Baronet, Christ Church (0)	
1952	lost	1 Timothy Wentworth Beaumont, Baron Beaumont of Whitley, Christ Church (-2); 2 Robert Hamilton Bishop, Corpus Christi; 3 C. A. Broadie; 4 Dan Lockwood McGurk, Christ Church	
1953	lost		
1954	lost	1 Giles Eden Fitzherbert, Christ Church; 2 Walter Murray Butcher, Worcester; 3 John Richard Wilson, New College, Captain; 4 Francis Paul Bowyer Nichols, Balliol	
1955	won	1 Sir Robert Noel Hutchings, Trinity; 2 Charles Arthur Russell Lockhart, Worcester (0); 3 Peter Robin Wilson, Trinity, Captain; 4 William Oliver Lane Fox-Pitt, Trinity	
1956	won	1 Sir Robert Noel Hutchings, Trinity; 2 Charles Arthur Russell Lockhart, Worcester (0); 3 Peter Robin Wilson, Trinity, Captain; 4 William Oliver Lane Fox-Pitt, Trinity	
1957	lost	1 Robert Hernando Franco, Trinity (-2); 2 Charles Arthur Russell Lockhart, Worcester (0); 3 Anthony Hugh Burns De Bono, Christ Church (1); 4 Anthony Aufrere Wallace-Turner, Trinity (-2)	Polo Captains of Cambridge and Oxford University 1957
1958	won	1 Edward de Bono, Christ Church; 2 Peter Palumbo, Baron Palumbo, Worcester; 3 Anthony Hugh Burns De Bono, Christ Church, Captain (1); 4 Sir Edward Stephen Cazalet, Christ Church	
1959	lost	1 Hugh Charles Vivian Smith, 4th Baron Bicester, Worcester; 2 Peter Palumbo, Worcester; 3 Dr Anthony Hugh Burns De Bono, Christ Church (1); 4 Edward Stephen Cazalet, Christ Church	

== 1960–1969 ==
Year	Result	Team Members	Picture
1960	-	not played due to a lack of horses on Cambridge side	
1961	-	not played due to a lack of horses on Cambridge side	
1962	lost	Jeremy D. Taylor, Lincoln	
1963	-	not played due to a lack of horses on Cambridge side	
1964	won	1 Claire Lucas, Somerville; 2 Malik Nazar Tiwana, Corpus Christi; 3 Jeremy D. Taylor, Lincoln, Captain; 4 David Peter Francis Birley, Christ Church	
1965	lost	1 Claire Lucas, Somerville; 2 Simon Tomlinson, University College; 3 David Peter Francis Birley, Christ Church	
1966	won	1 Claire Lucas, Somerville, first female Captain of OUPC (0); 2 Justin J. Cartwright, Trinity; 3 Simon Tomlinson, University College; 4 Julian Arthur Eeley, Wadham	
1967	won	1 Justin J. Cartwright, Trinity; 2 Simon Tomlinson, University College, Captain; 3 Julian Arthur Eeley, Wadham; 4 Christopher Philip Mackenzie (Chris) Ashton, Trinity	
1968	won	1 John Pirie Moir, Oriel; 2 Christopher Philip Mackenzie (Chris) Ashton, Trinity; 3 Julian Arthur Eeley, Wadham, Captain; 4 Anthony Clive Jellicoe Preston, University College (0)	Oxford University Varsity Polo Team 1968 H.M. Queen Elizabeth II presenting the Cup to Mr. J. Eeley (Wadham), the captain of the winning Oxford University polo team, 1968. Queen Elizabeth and winning Oxford team at the prize giving ceremony
1969	won	1 Robert Peter Allen Spiller, Christ Church; 2 Anthony Clive Jellicoe Preston, University College (0); 3 Charles Barnett, Christ Church (-1)	

== 1970–1979 ==
Year	Result	Team Members
1970	won	1 Douglas James Eeley (-1); 2 Redmond Watt, Christ Church (1); 3 Clive James Preston, Captain (0); 4 Charles Barnett, Christ Church (-1)
1971	won	1 Robert M. Lindemann, Christ Church (-2); 2. Christopher Andrew Joll, Mansfield (0); 3 Redmond Watt, Christ Church (2); 4 Chandos Alaric Graham Gore Langton, St Catherine's, Captain (0)
1972	won	1 Arturo Goetz, Jesus (2); 2 Azam Saigol, Brasenose (1); 3 Syed Shahid Ali, Captain (3); 4 Rafiq Jumabhoy, University (0)
1973	won	1 Michael Stanley Hunter Jones, Exeter, Captain (-2); 2 Azam Saigol, Brasenose (1); 3 Arturo Goetz, Jesus (3); 4 Rafiq Jumabhoy, University, Captain
1974	lost	Syed Shahid Ali (+3); Arturo Goetz, Jesus (+3);
1975	lost	1 William Jeffery Reeve, Exeter (-2); 2 Robert Mark Howes, Hertford (-2); 3 Chris Elston, Worcester, Captain (1); 4 John H. Bodkin, St Edmund Hall (-1)
1976	won	1 Salahuddin Alamgir Masud, Brasenose; 2 Bruce Dakowski; 3 John Hugh Crisp, Christ Church (0); 4 Chris Whitely, Trinity (-2)
1977	lost	John H. Bodkin, St Edmund Hall, Captain; John Hugh Crisp, Christ Church (0)
1978	lost	1 Bruce Dakowski (-2); 2 Mark Cunningham (-1); 3 John Hugh Crisp, Christ Church, Captain (0); 4 Chris Whitely, Trinity (-2)
1979	lost	1 John Hugh Crisp, Christ Church, Captain (0); 2 Bruce Dakowski (-2); 3 Mark Cunningham (-1); 4 Chris Whitely, Trinity (-2)

== 1980–1989 ==
Year	Result	Team Members	Picture
1980	won	1 Chris Whitely (0); 2 James C. Hopkins, Mansfield (-2); 3 Alamgir Masud, Brasenose, Captain; 4 H.H. Tengku Mahkota of Pahang, Worcester	Varsity Match in 19807
1981	won	1 Brooks Newmark, Worcester (-1); 2 Richard Rowley, Exeter (-2); 3 Andrew Sutcliffe, Worcester; 4 James Hopkins, Mansfield, Captain (-2)	
1982	won	1 M. Davies (-2); 2 Brooks Newmark, Worcester (-1); 3 Richard Milne, Oriel (0); 4 Richard Rowley, Exeter (-2)	Oxford University Varsity Team 1982
1983	won	Richard Milne, Oriel, Captain (0)	
1984	lost	1 B. Cardozo (-2); 2 Charles Leftwich, St John's (0); 3 M. Noon (0); 4 Richard Milne, Captain, Oriel (0)	
1985	lost	1 Scott Mackay, St Edmund Hall (1); 2 Michael Reynal, New College (0); 3 Alastair Flanagan (1); 4 Charles Leftwich, St John's, Captain (0)	
1986	won	1 Scott Mackay, St Edmund Hall (1); 2 Michael Reynal, New College (0); 3 Alastair Flanagan (1); 4 Shakir Wissa	
1987	lost	1 Amir Farman-Farma,St Antony's (1); 2 Michael Reynal, New College, Captain (0)	
1988	lost	1 K. Griggs (-2); 2 Michael Reynal, New College, Captain (0); 3 Amir Farman-Farma, St Antony's (1); 4 David Polkinghorne, Pembroke (0)	
1989	won	1 Pietro Gilardini, Pembroke (-2); 2 Tariq K. Isa, Mansfield (-2); 3 Amir Farman-Farma, St Antony's (1); 4 David Polkinghorne, Pembroke, Captain (1)	Oxford University Varsity Polo Team 1989

== 1990–1999 ==
Year	Result	Team Members
1990	lost	1 Denver Dudley Stanton Dale, St John's (-2); 2 Tariq Isa, Mansfield, Captain (-1); 3 Amir Sing-Pasrich, Worcester (-1); 4 Andre Stern, Trinity (0)
1991	lost	1 Jan Curtis Larsen (-1); 2 Paul Lalor, Jesus (1); 3 Amir Sing-Pasrich, Worcester, Captain (0); 4 James (Jim) Tuttle, Wolfson (0)
1992	won	1 Philip Kennedy; 2 James (Jim) Tuttle, Wolfson (0); 3 Paul Lalor, Jesus, Captain (1); 4 Nick Hassall, Corpus Christ
1993	won	1 Alannah Weston, Merton (0); 2 Jacqui Broughton, St Edmund Hall, Discretionary Full Blue (0); 3 Paul Lalor, Jesus (1); 4 James (Jim) Tuttle, Wolfson, Captain (0)
1994	lost	1 Alastair Vere Nicoll, St Hugh's (-2); 2 Jacqui Broughton, St Edmund Hall, Discretionary Full Blue, Captain (0); 3 Andrew Dechet, Jesus (0); 4 Cameron Walton Masters, St Peter's (3)
1995	lost	1 Alastair Vere Nicholl, St Hugh's (-1); 2 Andrew Dechet, Jesus (0); Cameron Walton Masters, St. Peter's, Captain (3); Jacqui Broughton, St Edmund Hall (0)
1996	lost	1 Tessa Canning-Cooke, St Hilda's (-2); 2 Kojo Awuah-Darko, Balliol (0); 3 Alastair Vere Nicoll, St Hugh's (0); Cameron Walton Masters, St. Peter's, BPP, Captain (3)
1997	lost	1 Kojo Awuah-Darko, Balliol (0); 2 François Perrodo, St Peter's (1); 3 Cameron Walton Masters, St Peter's, Captain (3); 4 Jo Chikwe, St Peter's, Chairman (-2)
1998	lost	1 Reda Hassa (Rida) Said, Pembroke (-2); 2 James Hoffman, Magdalen (-2); 3 Alastair Lamb, Corpus Christi (-1); 4 Jason Kingsley, St John's (0)
1999	lost	1 Edward Upton, Magdalen (-1); 2 Francois Perrodo, St Peter's, Captain (1); 3 Alastair Lamb, Corpus Christi (0); 4 Reda Hasse (Rida) Said, Pembroke (-1)

== 2000–2009 ==
Year	Result	Team Members	Picture
2000	won	1 Hugo Guy Sylvester Grimston, Worcester (-1); 2 Edward Upton, Magdalen (-1); 3 Francois Perrodo, St Peter's, Captain (1); 4 Alastair Lamb, Corpus Christi, (0)	Oxford Varsity polo team 2000
2001	lost	1 Russell Barker (-2); 2 Lt Col Stuart Cowen (0); 3 Edward Upton, Magdalen (-1); 4 Hugo Guy Sylvester Grimston, Worcester (-1)	
2002	lost	1 Jonathan Randall, Worcester (-1); 2 Rob Follows, Saïd Business School (1); 3 Russell Barker (-1); 4 Matthew Penley, University College (-1)	
2003	won	1 Pablo Goetz, Green College (-2); Quintin Fraser (-2); 2 Jonathan Randall, Worcester, Captain (-1); 3 Matthew Penley, University College (-1); 4 Hugo Guy Sylvester Grimston, Worcester (-1)	
2004	won	1 Harry Townsend, St Catherine's (0); 2 Matthew Penley, University, Captain (-1); 3 Jose (Pepe) Penafiel, St Benet's (2); 4 Philippa Grace, Saïd Business School (1)	
2005	won	1 Alex Gleeson, LMH (0), 1 Jamie Dundas, Greyfriars (1); 2 John Harris, St Peter's (2); 3 Jose (Pepe) Penafiel, St Benet's (2); 4 Harry Townsend, St Catherine's, Captain (0)	
2006	lost	1 Elizabeth Kiernan (-2); 2 Tom Bowden (-2); 3 Alex Leuba, Exeter (-2); 4 Jamie Dundas, Greyfriars (1)	
2007	won	1 Henriette Seligman (-2); 2 Frederik Vannberg (-2); 3 Alex Gleeson, LMH, Captain, MVP (0); 4 Jamie Dundas, Greyfriars (1)	
2008	won	1 Magdy Fawzy (-2); 2 Alex Gleeson, LMH (0); 3 Tarquin Wethered, Balliol, BPP (0); 4 Alexander Piltz (0)	
2009	won	1 Henrietta Seligman, St Anne's (-1); 2 William Spray, New College (0); 3 Thomas Mayou, Mansfield, MVP (O); 4 Tarquin Wethered, Balliol, Captain (0)	Varsity polo match at Kirtlington Polo Park 2009 Varsity Polo Match 2009 at Kirtlington Park

== 2010–2019 ==
Year	Result	Team Members	Pictures
2010	won	1 Tarquin Wethered, Balliol (0); 2 Tom Meacher, St Hugh's (0); 3 William Spray, New College (0); 4 Thomas Mayou, Mansfield (1)	Oxford University Varsity team 2010
2011	won	1 Maximilian Kirchhoff, Harris Manchester (0); 2 Samuel George, University (0); 3 Thomas Mayou, Mansfield (1); 4 Tom Meacher, St Hugh's, Captain (1)	Oxford University Varsity team 2011
2012	lost	1 George Allen, St Benet's (-1); 2 Jamie Lindsay, Brasenose (0); 3 Samuel George, University College, Captain (0); 4 Tomas Meacher, St Hugh's (1)	Varsity Match 2012 Varsity polo team 2012
2013	won	1 Lanto Sheridan, Harris Manchester, Discretionary Full Blue (4); 2 James Lindsay, Brasenose (0); 3 George Allen, St Benet's, Captain (-1); 4 Elli Gilje, Keble (-2)	Oxford beats Cambridge 11–3 in 2013.
2014	lost	1 Ellie Gilje, Keble (-2); 2 Lawrence Wang, Brasenose (-1); 3 James Lindsay, Brasenose, Captain (0); 4 Tomas Reynal, Saïd Business School (2)	Varsity polo team 2014
2015	won	1 Lawrence Wang, Brasenose (-1); 2 Louis Maddison, St Hugh's (0); 3 Vere Harmsworth, St Peter's (-1); 4 George Pearson, Christ Church (2)	Varsity polo team 2015
2016	won	1 Charlie James Hitchman, Magdalen (0); 2 Louis Maddison, St Hugh's, Captain (0); 3 Vere Harmsworth, St Peter's (0); 4 George Pearson, Christ Church, MVP (2)	
2017	won	1 Issa Dasu Patel, LMH (-2); 2 Heather Winsor, Brasenose (-1); 3 Charlie James Hitchman, Magdalen, MVP, Captain (0); 4 Sally Schwartz, St Catherine's (-2)	Oxford University Varsity team 2017
2018	won	1 Heather Winsor, Brasenose (-1); 2 Ben Evans, Corpus Christi (-2); 3 Christiaan de Koning, Christ Church (-2); 4 Louis Maddison, St Hugh's, MVP, Captain (0)	Oxford University Varsity team 2018
2019	won	1 James Thomas Coates, St Hugh's/ Freddie Schrager, Worcester (-1); 2 Christiaan de Koning, Christ Church (-2); 3 Tamara Gibbons, St Edmund Hall, MVP, Captain (1); 4 Charlie James Hitchman, Magdalen, BPP (0)	Oxford University Varsity team 2019

== 2020–2026 ==
Year	Result	Team Members	Picture
2020	-	no match due to the COVID-19 pandemic	
2021	won	1 Jamie Baillie, St John’s (-1); 2 Cecily Day, St John’s (0); 3 Tom Gordon-Colebrooke, Green-Templeton, Captain (1); 4 Tamara Gibbons, St Edmund, MVP (0)	Oxford University Polo team winning against Cambridge in 2021
2022	won	1 Camilla Hyslop, Worcester (-1); 2 Matthew Burns Barnard, Keble (0); 3 Tom Gordon-Colebrooke, Green-Templeton, BPP, Captain (1); 4 Tamara Gibbons, St Edmund (0)	Oxford University Polo team winning against Cambridge in 2022
2023	won	1 Camilla Hyslop, Worcester (-1); 2 Jamie Baillie, St John's (-1); 3 Bolowa Tejuoso, BPP; 4 Tom Gordon-Colebrooke, Green-Templeton, Captain (1)	Oxford University Polo team winning against Cambridge in 2023
2024	won	1 George Tebbutt, Trinity (-2); 2 Joshua Cheung (-2); 3 Zelda Hollings, University (-1); 4 Camilla Hyslop, Worcester, MVP, Captain (-1)	Oxford University Polo team winning against Cambridge in 2024
2025	won	1 Harry Rourke, New College (0); 2 Sufiyan Alim, Worcester (0); 3 Matthew Byrne, Green Templeton, Captain (-1); 4 Camilla Hyslop, Worcester, MVP (-1)	Oxford University Polo team winning against Cambridge in 2025
2026	won	1 Harry Rourke, New College, MVP (0); 2 Tate Lavitt, New College, BPP (0); 3 Matthew Byrne, Green Templeton (-1); 4 Sufiyan Alim, Worcester, Captain (0)	Oxford University Polo Team 2026 Oxford University Polo team winning against Cambridge in 2026

- MVP denotes Most Valuable Player
- BPP denotes Best Playing Pony

== See also ==
- The Varsity Polo Match
- Oxford University Polo Club
- Cambridge University Polo Club
