= List of Argentine films of 2010 =

A list of films produced in Argentina in 2010:

Argentine films of 2010
Title	Director	Release	Genre
A - B
Adolfo Pérez Esquivel. Otro mundo es posible	Miguel Mirra	7 October	
Adopción	David Lipszyc	25 February	
Aguas Verdes	Mariano De Rosa	22 April	
Amor en tránsito	Lucas Blanco	2 December	
Andrés no quiere dormir la siesta	Daniel Bustamante	4 February	
Ártico	Santiago Loza	4 February	
Awka Liwen - Rebelde amanecer	Mariano Aiello y Kristina Hille	9 September	
Belgrano	Sebastián Pivotto		Histórico
Boca de fresa	Jorge Zima	11 November	
El bosque	Pablo Siciliano y Eugenio Lasserre	November	
C
Cabeza de pescado	July Massaccesi	15 July	
Carancho	Pablo Trapero	6 May	Drama
La casa por la ventana	Juan Olivares y Esteban Rojas	16 December	
Che. Un hombre nuevo	Tristán Bauer	7 October	
Cine, dioses y billetes	Lucas Brunetto	13 May	
Como bola sin manija	Miguel Frías, Pablo Osores y Roberto Testa	11 November	
Cómplices del silencio	Stefano Incerti	17 June	
Cuentos de la selva	Norman Ruiz y Liliana Romero	22 July	
E
Diletante	Kris Niklison	6 May	
Dioses	Josué Méndez	27 May	
Dos hermanos	Daniel Burman	1 April	Drama
Ernesto Sabato, mi padre	Mario Sábato	25 March	
Eva & Lola	Sabrina Farji	13 May	Drama
Excursiones	Ezequiel Acuña	7 January	
F - G
Flores of September	Pablo Osores, Roberto Testa y Nicolás Wainszelbaum	16 September	
Fortalezas	Tomás Lipgot y Christoph Behl	29 April	
Fragmentos de una búsqueda	Pablo Milstein y Norberto Ludin	2 September	
Francia	Israel Adrián Caetano	17 June	Drama
Franzie	Alejandra Marino	21 October	
Gaturro, la film	Gustavo Cova	9 September	Animated
Gigante	Adrián Biniez	14 October	
H - L
Las hermanas L	Santiago Giralt, Eva Bär, Alejandro Montiel y Diego Schipani	25 November	Comedia
El hombre de al lado	Gastón Duprat & Mariano Cohn	2 September	Drama
La hora de la siesta	Sofía Mora	6 May	
Huellas y memoria de Jorge Prelorán	Fermín Rivera	30 September	
Igualita a mí	Diego Kaplan	12 August	Comedia
In the Future (En el futuro)	Mauro Andrizzi	September	Documentary
La Tigra, Chaco	Federico Godfrid y Juan Sasiaín	7 January	Comedia
La Plegaria del Vidente	Gonzalo Calzada	October 15	Policial
Lejos de casa	Miguel Mirra	21 October	
Lengua materna	Liliana Paolinelli	21 October	
M - N
La madre	Gustavo fontán	25 February	
Matar a Videla	Nicolás Capelli	7 January	
Maytland	Marcelo Charras	2 December	
La mirada invisible	Diego Lerman	19 August	Drama
Mis días con Gloria	Juan José Jusid	16 September	
Miss Tacuarembó	Martín Sastre	15 July	Comedia
La mosca en la ceniza	Gabriela David	25 March	Drama
La muestra	Lino Pujia	25 March	
El mural	Héctor Olivera	20 May	
Ni dios, ni patrón, ni marido	Laura Mañá	23 September	
O - P
Octubre Pilagá, relatos sobre el silencio	Valeria Mapelman	7 October	
Orquesta roja	Nicolás Herzog	7 October	
Otro entre otros	Maximiliano Pelosi	19 August	
Paco	Diego Rafecas	18 March	Drama
Padres de la plaza - 10 recorridos posibles	Joaquín Daglio	14 October	
Pájaros volando	Néstor Montalbano	5 August	Comedia
Pecados de mi padre	Nicolás Entel	22 April	
El perseguidor	Víctor Cruz	9 December	
El piano mudo	Jorge Zuhair Jury	10 June	
Plumíferos	Daniel De Felippo	18 February	Animated
Por tu culpa	Anahí Berneri	3 June	Drama
R - Z
El Rati Horror Show	Enrique Piñeyro	16 September	Documentary
La Razón	Gustavo Charif	6 October	Drama
El recuento de los daños	Inés de Oliveira Cézar	1 July	Drama
Rompecabezas	Natalia Smirnoff	29 April	
La sangre y la lluvia	Jorge Navas	29 July	
Sin retorno	Miguel Cohan	30 September	
Sofía cumple 100 años	Hernán Belón	16 September	
Teatro Colón: Música Palabras Silencio	Bebe Kamín	21 October	
Un buen día	Nicolás Del Boca	18 November	
Un fueguito. La historia de César Milstein	Ana Fraile	11 March	
Un lugar lejano	José Ramón Novoa	20 April	
Vecinos	Rodolfo Durán	15 April	
Los viajes del viento	Ciro Guerra	11 February	
Vikingo	José Celestino Campusano	4 November	
Zenitram	Luis Barone	20 May	
4 3 2 uno	Mercedes Farriols	2 December	

== See also ==
- 2010 in Argentina
