= Oxford University Polo Club =

University polo club in Oxford, England

- Nickname: Dark Blues
- School: University of Oxford
- Founded: 1874
- Association: Hurlingham Polo Association
- Location: Oxford, England
- Home ground: Kirtlington Park Polo Club
- Colours: Dark Blue
- Website: www.oxforduniversitypoloclub.com

The Oxford University Polo Club (OUPC) is the university sports club for polo at the University of Oxford. Founded in 1874, it is one of the oldest surviving polo clubs in the world and has a long tradition of competitive university polo. The sport is recognised as a Discretionary Full Blue sport at Oxford.

The club is particularly known for its annual Varsity Match against Cambridge University Polo Club, first contested in 1878 and regarded as one of the oldest continuing polo fixtures in the world. Traditionally held in early summer, the match currently takes place at Guards Polo Club in Windsor Great Park.

Alongside its Varsity tradition, the club provides training and competitive opportunities for players of all abilities, from complete beginners to experienced polo players. Its activities include intercollegiate Cuppers competitions, university tournaments, international fixtures and both outdoor and arena polo.

== History ==
=== Early history ===
Drawing of the match between Christ Church and Brasenose in 1877.

The Oxford University Polo Club was founded in 1874 by Walter Hume Long (1854–1924), later Viscount Long of Wraxall and First Lord of the Admiralty. Together with a group of friends from Wiltshire who had come to study at Oxford, he established the club on a mown hayfield in Port Meadow, near Wolvercote, Oxford. The field, measuring 280 by 170 yards, became the basis of the club's polo grounds for several decades. The ground was subsequently improved with old turf to allow play in a wider range of weather conditions, and boards were added in 1930.

During the winter months, matches were played at the Bullingdon Club cricket ground in Cowley, as the summer ground in Port Meadow was prone to flooding from the River Isis. The club played throughout the year, largely using hirelings (rented polo ponies). Regular playing days were Mondays, Wednesdays and Fridays, with an average of approximately twelve playing members.

The earliest records indicate that the club played at Hurlingham in 1876 and organised an exhibition match between Christ Church and Brasenose College at Christ Church Meadow on 1 July 1877. During its first decade, teams generally consisted of five players, until the introduction of the modern four-player format in 1883.

The Varsity Match against Cambridge was established following the inter-college match of 1877. The first Varsity Match took place at the Bullingdon Cricket Ground in Oxford on 27 November 1878, making it one of the oldest university sporting fixtures among Oxford's Blues sports. From 1879 until 1939, the match was generally held at the Hurlingham Club, with the exceptions of 1894 and 1900 and the interruption caused by the First World War, when no matches were played between 1915 and 1919.

In the early years, the clubs presented specially commissioned silver coins as trophies. The Challenge Cup, which remains in use today, was donated by the Hurlingham Club when the match resumed in 1920 following the war. Individual players subsequently received replicas of the Challenge Cup.

The Oxford University Open Tournament, by contrast, had no associated trophy. Attracting teams with combined handicaps of up to 18 goals, the tournament was a notable fixture in the British polo season before the First World War.

Devereux Milburn in his student days.

Several early club members went on to achieve prominence in international polo. William Kavanagh, a member of Oxford's early Varsity teams, became one of the first high-handicap players and represented England against the United States on several occasions.

Thomas "Tommy" Hitchcock Sr., who represented Oxford in the 1880s, subsequently became one of America's leading polo players. Within three years of leaving Oxford, he captained the American national team and became one of the first players to achieve a 10-goal handicap. His son, Thomas Hitchcock, Jr., followed in his footsteps, becoming a 10-goal player and leading the United States to victory in the 1921 International Polo Cup, one year after leaving Oxford.

Around 1900, the Oxford team included the three Nickalls brothers, two of whom later represented England. Their contribution helped Oxford defeat Cambridge 15–0 in the 1898 Varsity Match.

Five years later, another American student, Devereux Milburn, arrived at Oxford and went on to become one of the most prominent polo players of his generation. In addition to earning a rowing Blue and representing the university in swimming, Milburn led the polo team to consecutive Varsity victories, each by a margin of 14 goals. On one occasion, he competed against Cambridge in both swimming and polo on the same day.

Milburn subsequently established an international career, playing at number four for the United States in every international match between 1909 and 1927. He was described as "the greatest back there has ever been" and became particularly renowned for his defensive play.

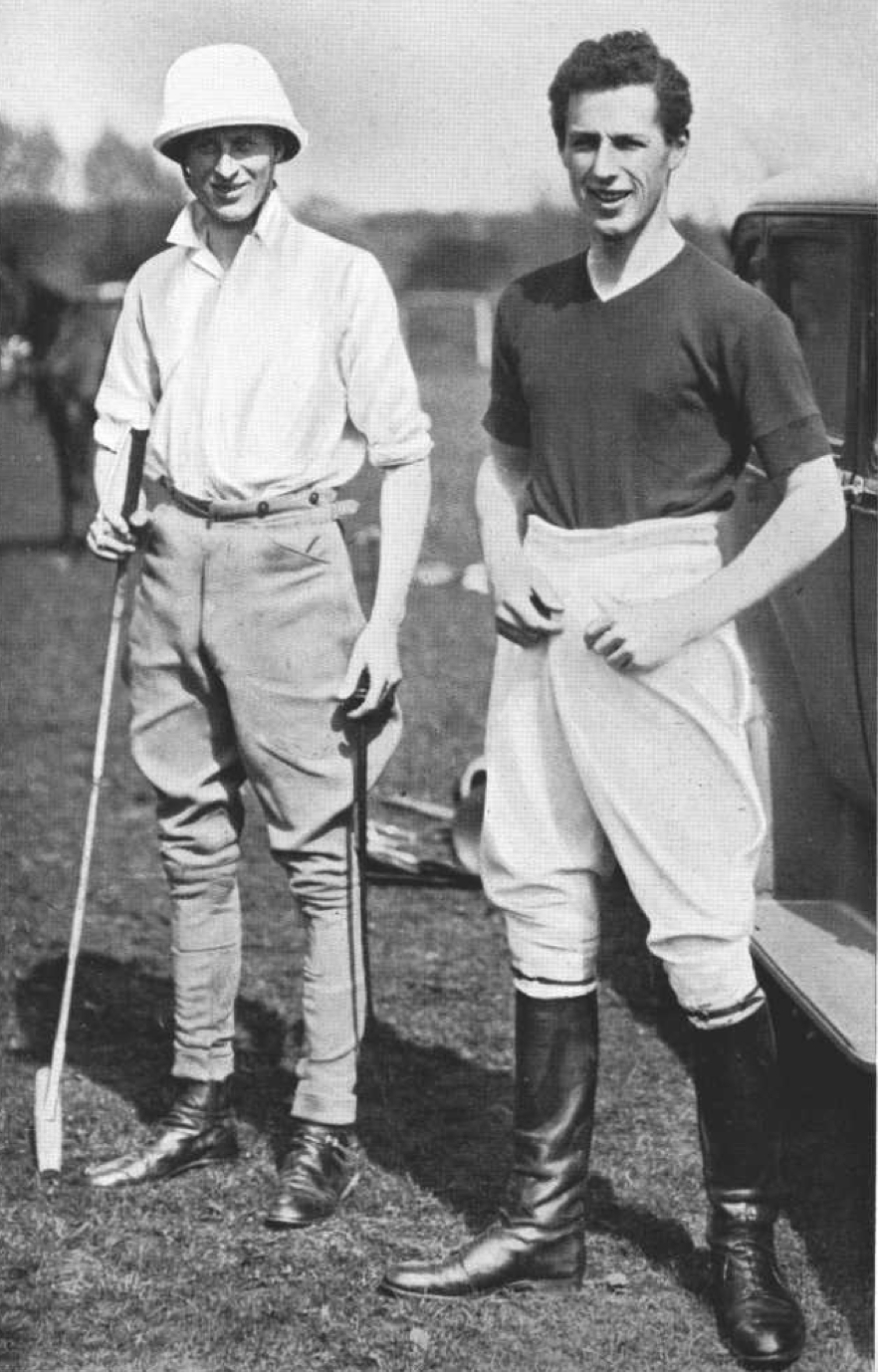
Oxford University polo players Peter Oldfield and John Lakin (right) in 1932.

As a member of the celebrated "Big Four", Milburn contributed to the development of the modern back position in polo. While the traditional English approach had emphasised a largely defensive role, similar to that of a goalkeeper in football, Milburn helped establish a more active and influential style of play. His dedication also reflected the increasing professionalism of the sport during this period.

Among the club's coaches and prominent supporters were Captain James Pearce, Lord Cowdray and Winston Churchill. Churchill, himself a keen polo player, frequently travelled from Blenheim Palace to Port Meadow to play and assist the Oxford Varsity team, providing what was described as "a good gallop and a pipe-opener" before the inter-Varsity match.

=== Post-war revival ===
After the Second World War, the Oxford University Polo Club resumed its activities with the support of Henley Polo Club. The Varsity Match was revived in 1951, with matches subsequently played at Woolmers Park, through the support of former Cambridge player George Lucas, and at Cowdray Park, through the assistance of Viscount Cowdray. An Old Oxonian who had represented Oxford in the 1930s, Cowdray also served as a steward and chairman of the Hurlingham Polo Association between 1947 and 1957.

From the early 1960s, the venue for the Varsity Match was selected annually, with the choice alternating between the two universities. No match was played in 1960 because Cambridge lacked sufficient ponies. Oxford generally favoured Kirtlington Park Polo Club, which had become the club's home ground in 1954. Since 1994, the Varsity Match has generally been held at Guards Polo Club, although some matches have taken place at other venues.

=== The 1960s and 1970s ===

During the late 1960s and early 1970s, when Prince Charles, then Prince of Wales, represented Cambridge, Oxford enjoyed a run of eight consecutive Varsity victories. The winning streak came to an end in 1974, despite Oxford fielding one of its strongest teams of the period. Syed Shahid Ali and Arturo Goetz each held a three-goal handicap, while the remaining players were rated at one goal. Cambridge, fielding a team with a combined handicap of minus one, nevertheless won the match.

Several players from this period subsequently achieved prominence in the polo world. General Sir Redmond Watt, who played off a two-goal handicap while at Oxford, later became one of the highest-rated post-war Oxford Blues, reaching a handicap of five goals.

Claire Lucas (later Tomlinson), who played off a zero-goal handicap while at university, became one of the leading players in the number one position and the first woman in the world to achieve a five-goal handicap. She challenged the restrictions on women's participation in British high-goal polo and became the first woman to compete alongside men at the highest level.

Her participation in the 1964 Varsity Match marked the first appearance of a woman in the competition. As women were not permitted to compete, she was entered as "Mr Lucas" and was asked to put up her hair and disguise herself as a man. In 1966, she became the first female captain of OUPC.

Her father, Arthur Lucas, also played an important role in the development of university polo. Through his coaching and Easter vacation training camps at Woolmers Park, the Lucas family home, he introduced and encouraged numerous young riders to take up the sport while at university.

Varsity Match in 1980.

=== Recent years ===
In 1994, both Varsity teams were captained by women for the first time, marking a milestone in the history of mixed-gender university sport. Jacqui Broughton captained Oxford, while Emma Tomlinson led Cambridge. This was also the first occasion in the history of any mixed-gender university sport on which both opposing Varsity teams had female captains.

Oxford enjoyed another successful period in the late 2000s, winning five consecutive Varsity Matches between 2007 and 2011. The winning streak ended in 2012 when Oxford, despite fielding a strong team with a combined handicap of +2, suffered a 2–13 defeat to a Cambridge side rated at −5, largely because the Oxford players had never trained together.

In 2013, the club underwent a period of significant growth and organisational development under the chairmanship of Andreas Kranke. Membership expanded considerably, with more than 100 new members joining the club. The introduction of intercollegiate Cuppers competitions and a new Winter League brought the club's competitive structure more closely into line with that of established Full Blue sports at Oxford, where such competitions had long been an integral part of university sporting traditions.

The same year also marked a return to success on the field. Oxford regained the Varsity title with an 11–3 victory over Cambridge, supported by the arrival of Lanto Sheridan, whose four-goal handicap was the highest achieved by a post-war Oxford Varsity player while still at university.

In 2016, Oxford recorded a historic 19–0 victory over Cambridge, breaking a record that had stood for 103 years. The same year, polo was awarded Discretionary Full Blue status at Oxford University.

The year 2016 also saw the introduction of the Winter Varsity Match for arena polo, establishing a winter counterpart to the traditional summer Varsity Match. The club also revived the Atlantic Cup, a competition originally established in 1920. The revived tournament brought together university teams from Cambridge, Harvard, Oxford and Yale, with Oxford emerging as the winner. Oxford also won the University Challenge Cup at the Goldin Metropolitan Club in Tianjin, China, for the first time.

In 2017, a new Varsity tradition was established with the inaugural Claire Lucas Ladies Cup at Kirtlington, bringing together teams from Cambridge, Oxford and the University of St Andrews. Oxford won the competition undefeated. In the same academic year, Oxford defeated Cambridge 5–1 in the La Martina Varsity Match and successfully defended its University Challenge Cup title at the Goldin Metropolitan Club in Tianjin, winning the competition for the second consecutive year.

In 2019, Oxford recorded another convincing Varsity victory, defeating Cambridge 15–1.

In 2020, Oxford's arena polo team, consisting of Capucine Granchi, Tamara Gibbons and Max Rumsey, achieved three notable successes in the club's history. First, the team won the Open Division at the universities' National Championships, which attracted a total of 202 teams across all divisions. Second, the team completed an unbeaten season across all matches and tournaments. Third, it received the "Blues Team of the Year" award at the Oxford University Sports Awards. The team's opportunity to compete in the Varsity Match was subsequently lost due to restrictions imposed during the COVID-19 pandemic.

In 2026, Oxford extended its unbeaten Varsity run to eleven consecutive victories, defeating Cambridge 12–0 at Guards Polo Club in the sixth Varsity Match since the COVID-19 pandemic. The result marked the 127th meeting since the competition's establishment in 1878, bringing the overall series record to 70 wins for Oxford and 57 for Cambridge. A complete historical record of Oxford’s Varsity polo teams, including players, college affiliations, match results and photographs, is available at Oxford University Polo Club Varsity teams.

== Training and accessibility ==
The club welcomes players of all ability levels, including complete beginners with no previous riding experience. Regular training sessions, including practice chukkas, are held throughout the year in cooperation with professional polo player and HPA coach David Ashby and the Oxford Polo School. Players can also attend additional theory sessions during term time and intensive training camps during university vacations.

The club aims to make polo accessible to students from a wide range of backgrounds, challenging the social and financial barriers traditionally associated with the sport while also raising standards of play.

Arena polo provides a more affordable alternative to traditional outdoor polo. To encourage participation, the club offers subsidised lessons for students and financial assistance with tournament entry fees. These efforts to broaden access have accompanied a steady increase in the club's popularity since the early 2010s. By June 2013, the club had more than 100 active members.

== Varsity match ==
Drawing of the Varsity Match played in 1879.

The Varsity Match is unusual in that it is traditionally played without handicaps. The competition also permits mixed-gender teams, a relatively uncommon feature among Oxford University's Blues sports. The original conditions of the match were recorded as follows:

"No player eligible who has been a member of his University for more than four years, or who has not been in residence during the term in which the match takes place. Instituted in 1878. Played generally at Hurlingham, in June."

Old Oxonians: the three Nickalls brothers and Ernest Brassey (left to right) at Hurlingham in 1903.

Polo is currently recognised as a Discretionary Full Blue sport at Oxford University. Up to four Half Blues may be awarded at the chairman's discretion, based on the contributions made by players to the Varsity 'A' team. One Discretionary Full Blue may be awarded to a member of the Varsity 'A' team at the chairman's discretion, provided that Oxford wins the Varsity Match and the player holds a handicap of 0 or above. No Half Blues are awarded to members of the second or third teams.

The Old Blues match traditionally serves as the curtain-raiser for Varsity Day. Like the Varsity Match itself, it is an annual fixture, with records dating back to 1879. Historically known as the Old Oxonians vs Old Cantabs match, it brings together former players from Oxford and Cambridge. Beyond Varsity Day, both teams also played an important role in British polo, competing in other tournaments and events. They were regarded as among the strongest British polo teams until the Second World War brought an end to this period of prominence.

Oxford Varsity team in 2019.

Oxford wins the Varsity Match 19–0 in 2016.

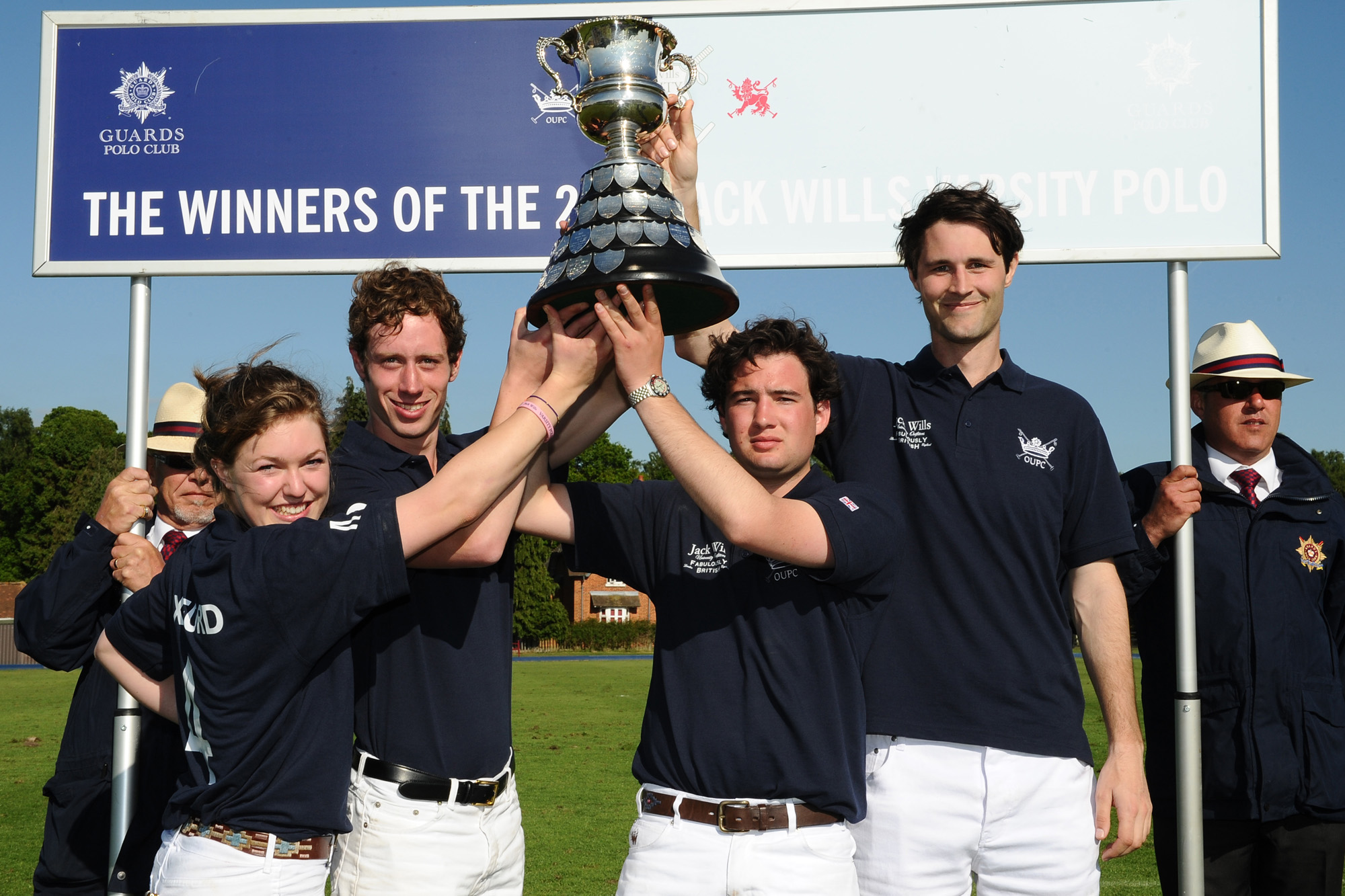
Oxford defeats Cambridge 11–3 in 2013.

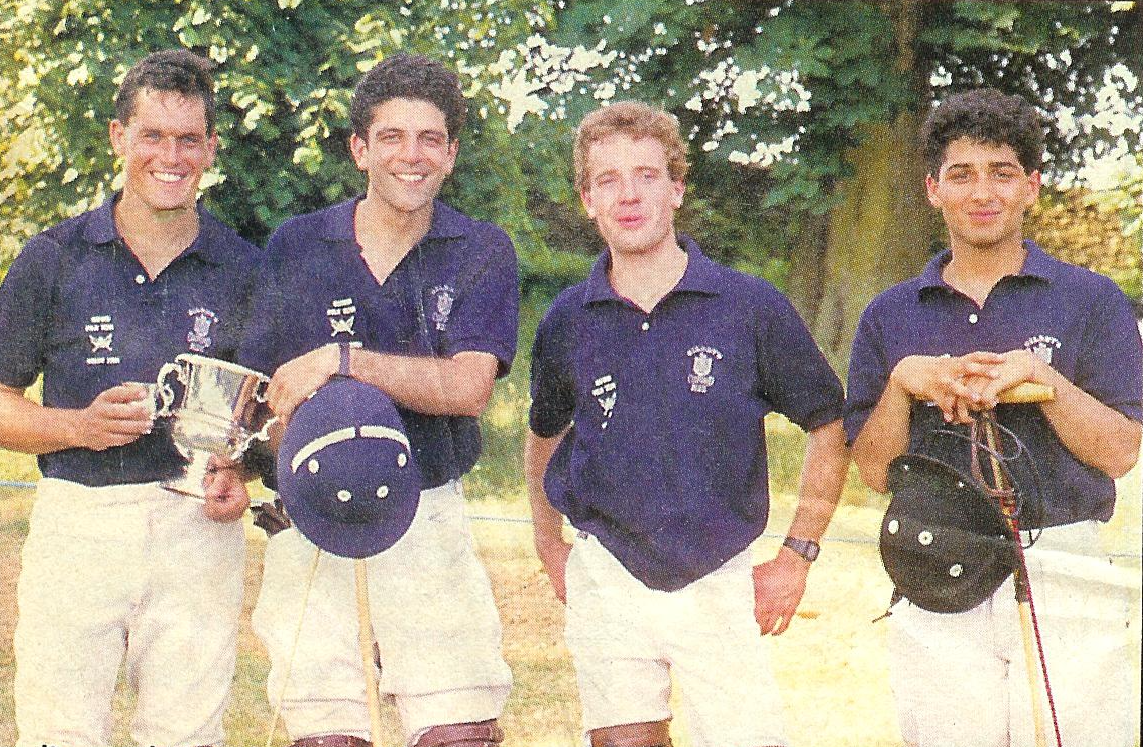
Oxford Varsity team in 1989.

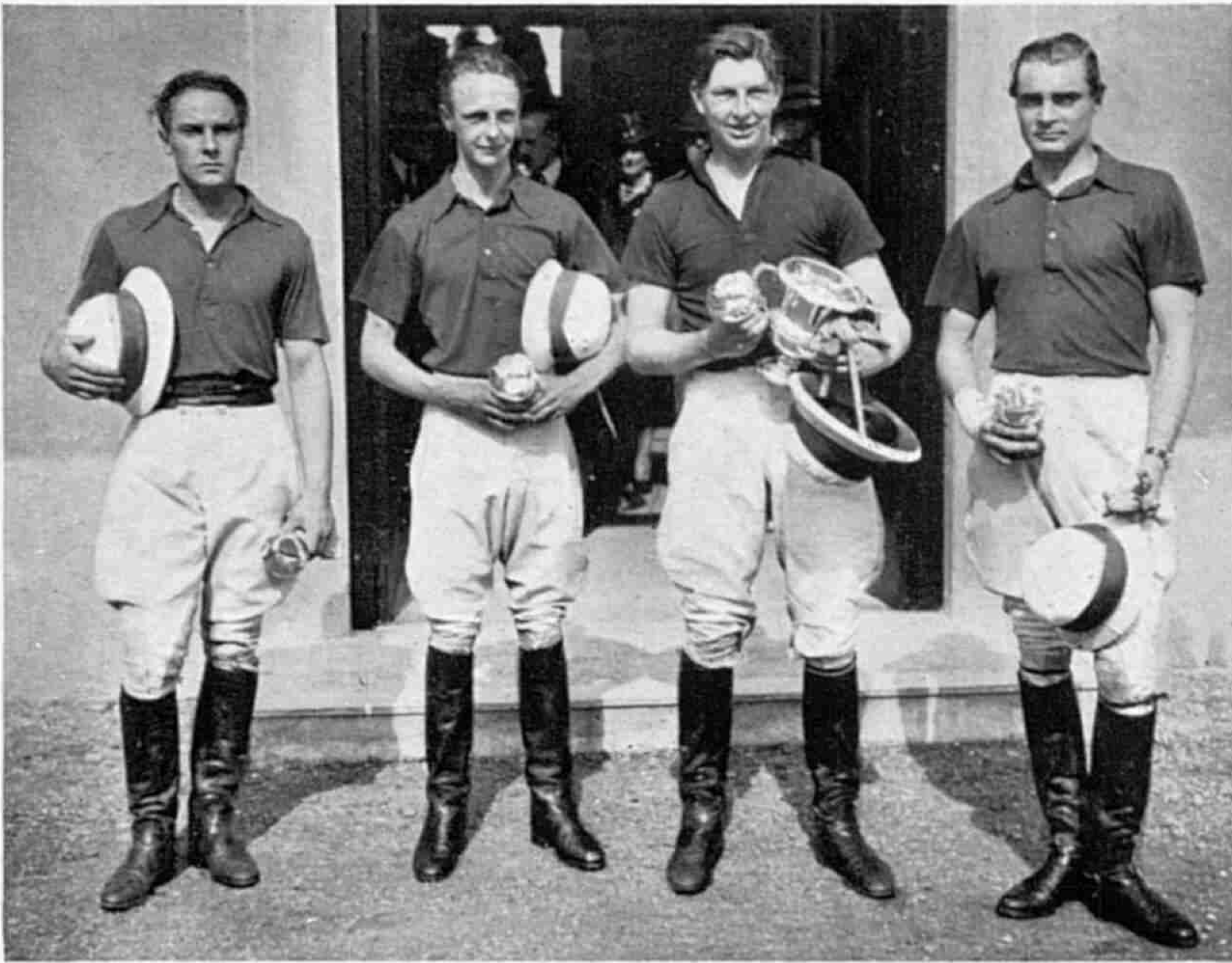
Oxford's victorious Varsity team in 1938.

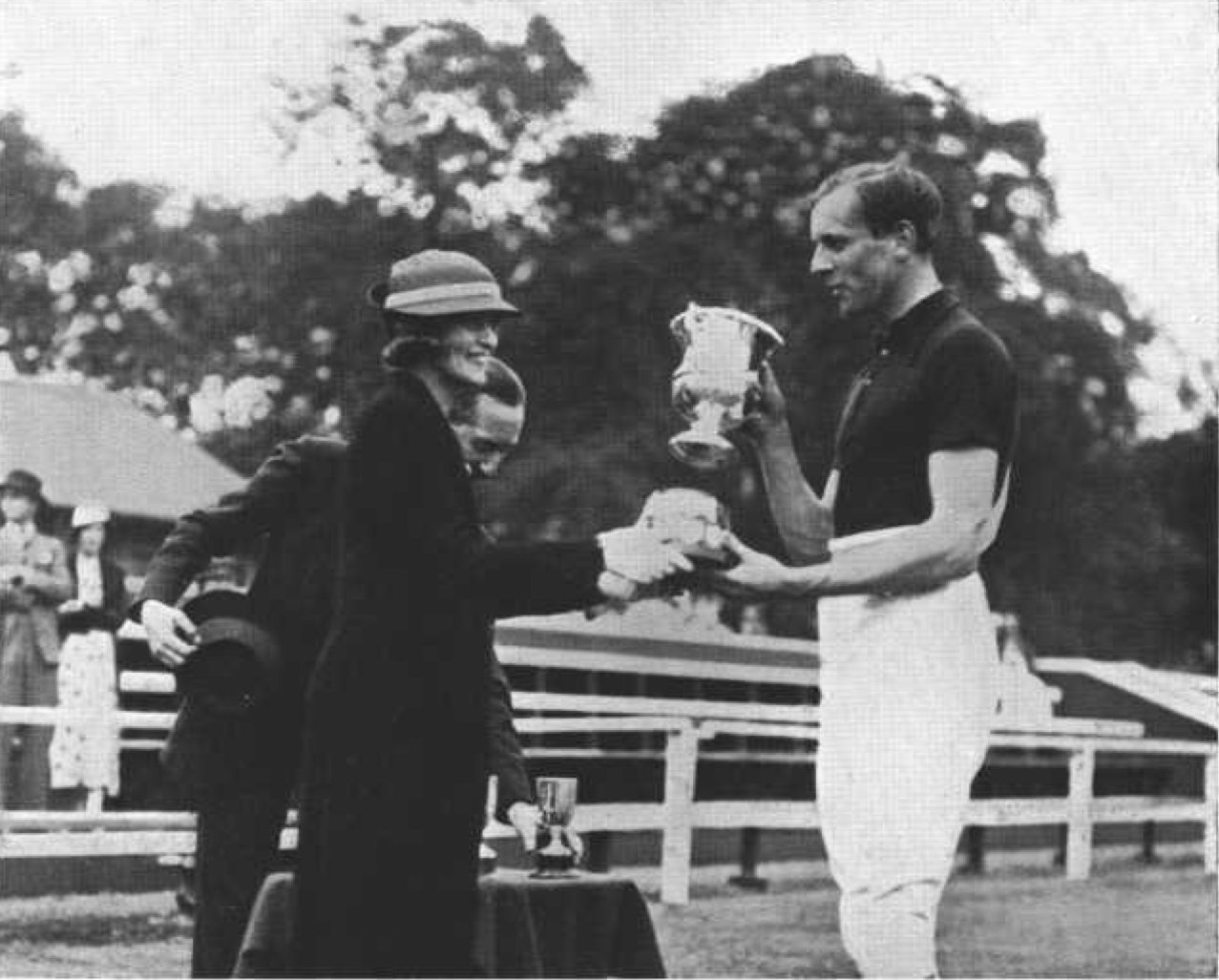
Lady Halifax presents the Inter-University Cup to her son Charles Wood, captain of Oxford's victorious Varsity team in 1934.

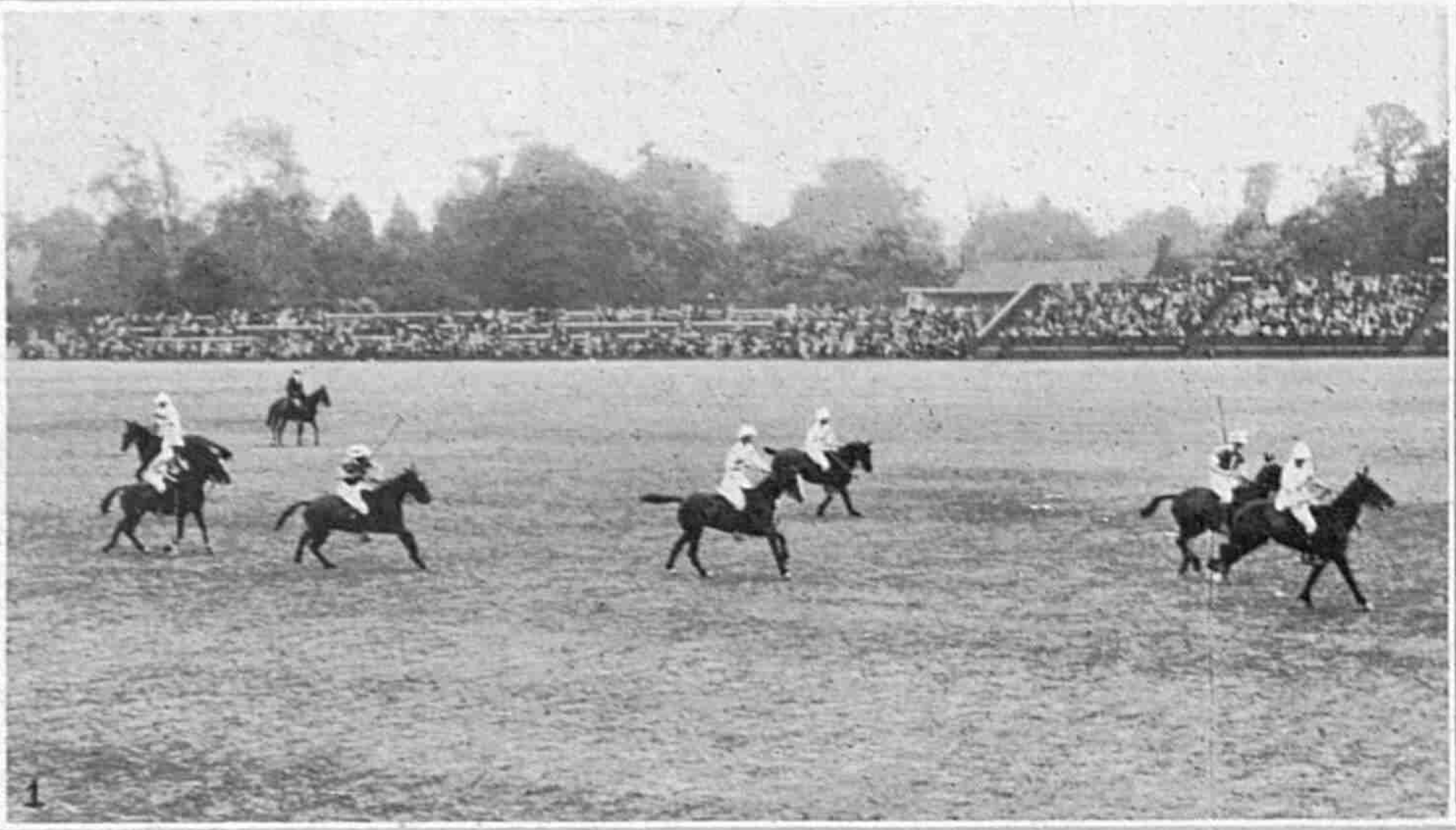
Play along the boards during the 1925 Varsity Match.

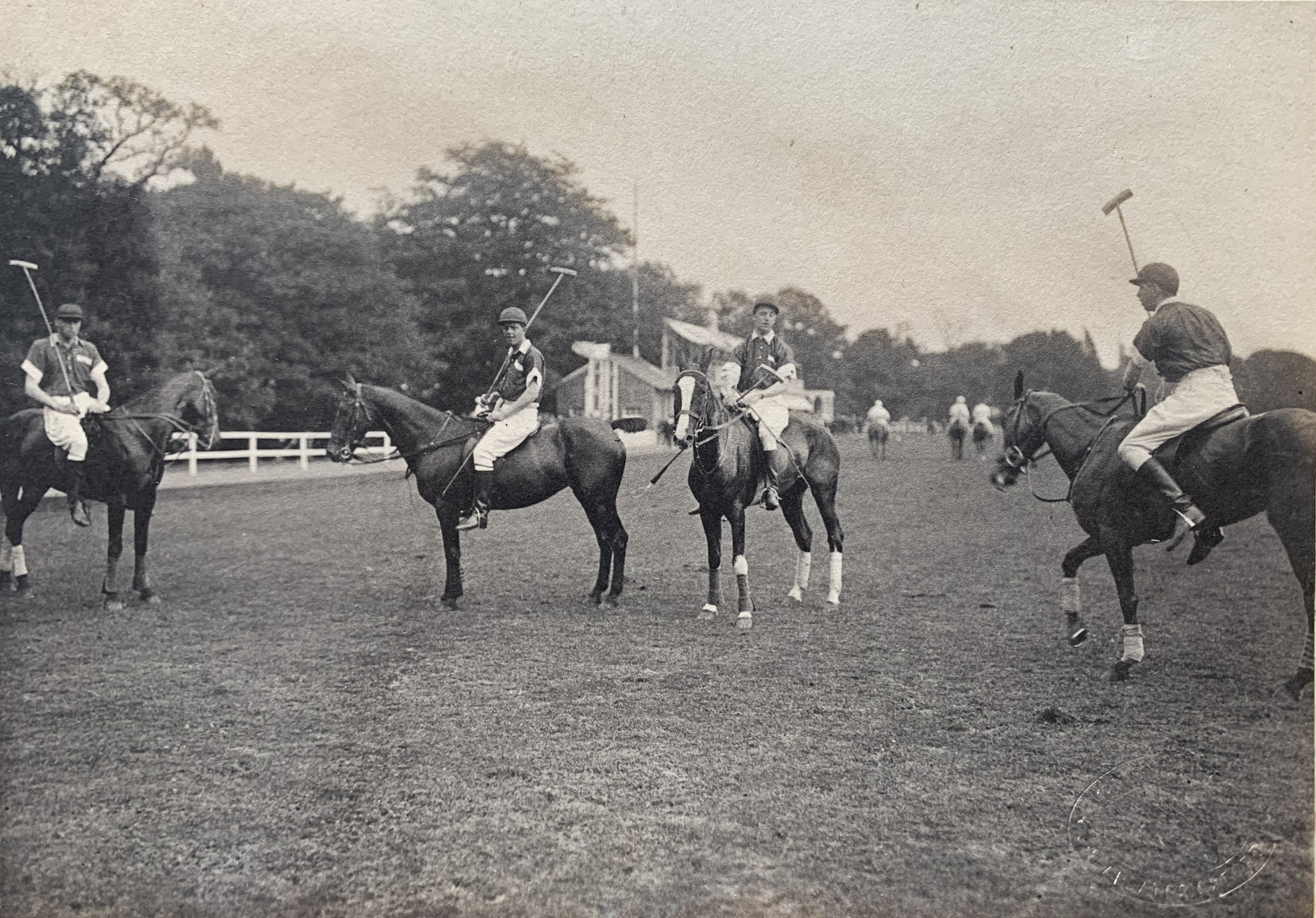
Oxford Varsity team in 1906.

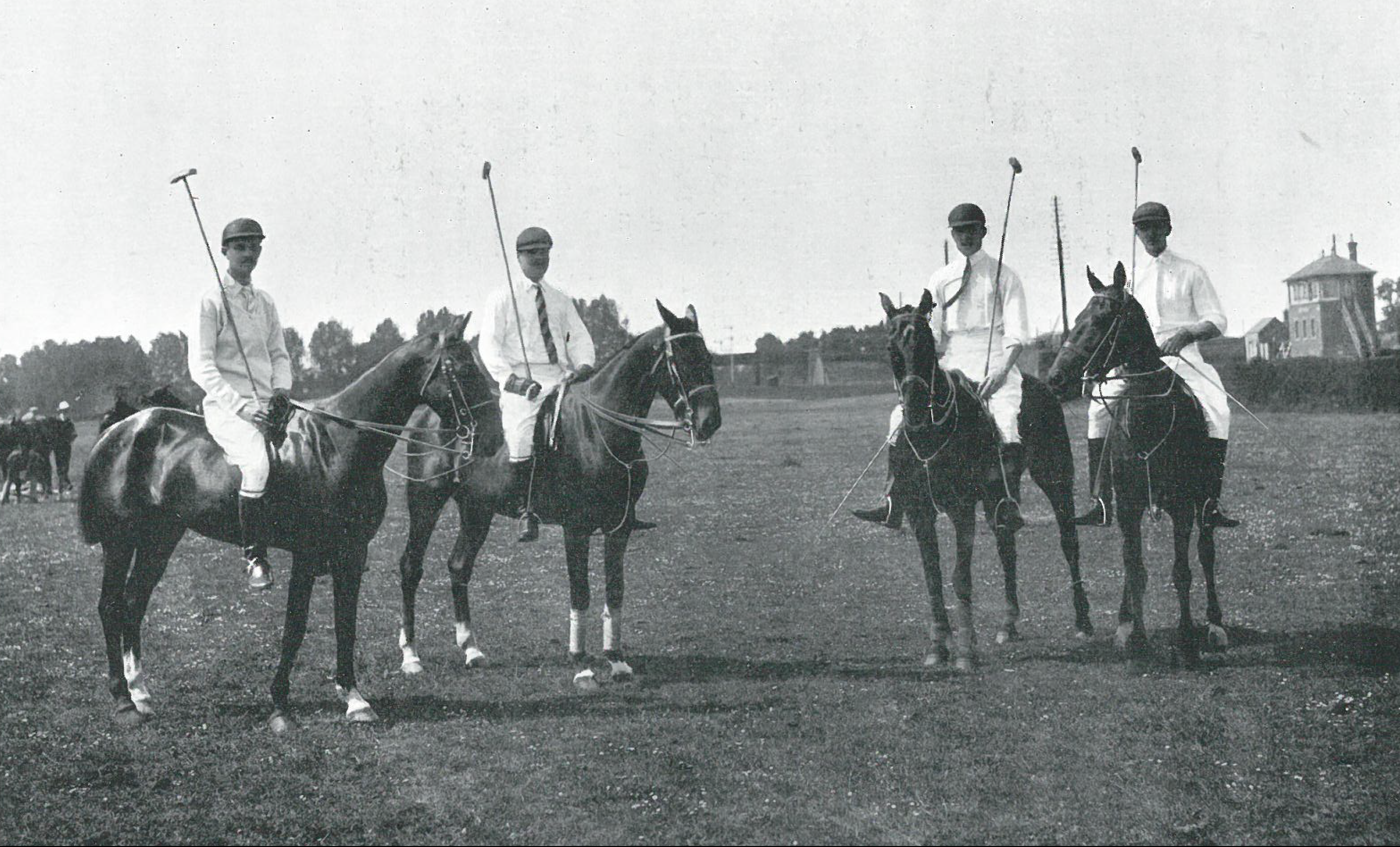
Oxford Varsity polo team in 1901.

== Cuppers ==
The Club runs termly inter-college polo competitions, or 'Cuppers'. In Michaelmas and Hilary Term (Arena Polo Season) it stages an intercollegiate Winter League. In Trinity Term (Outdoor Polo Season) it conducts an event on grass as a knockout competition on one weekend only. Colleges enter teams of three players. Only one guest from another college is allowed or the team runs under the category of a mixed team.

== Nationals and fixtures ==
The club competes in numerous exhibition matches and tournaments every year throughout the United Kingdom and increasingly abroad. Within the UK, it participates in the two principal university polo tournaments organised by the Schools and Universities Polo Association (SUPA): the Winter Nationals during Hilary and the Summer Nationals during Trinity. Regular fixtures include matches against the British Army at Sandhurst, Brookes University, universities in London and Skidmore College.

The Atlantic Cup, inaugurated in 2002, traditionally brings together Oxford, Cambridge, Yale and, since 2016, Harvard. The participating university clubs take turns hosting the tournament, coordinating transatlantic travel arrangements for visiting teams and assisting with the provision of polo ponies.

Since the inaugural Metropolitan Intervarsity Polo Tournament in 2013, the club has competed annually against leading student-run polo clubs from around the world at the Goldin Metropolitan Polo Club in Tianjin, China. The tournament takes place every July, with Oxford securing its first victory in 2016.

Club members and alumni compete internationally, most recently at British Polo Day events in Dubai, Singapore, Nihiwatu, India and Mexico, as well as at the Jaeger-LeCoultre Gold Cup. Members also participate in fixtures across continental Europe, particularly in Italy, France and Switzerland, contributing to the club's growing international presence and influence.

== In literature and film ==
In Hilda M. Sharp's 1917 novel The Stars in Their Courses (published by G. P. Putnam's), the young Hon. Patrick Kirkpatrick is portrayed as a skilled horseman and polo player at Christ Church, Oxford. His enthusiasm for polo and hunting, together with his gambling, leads him into debt.

Author F. Scott Fitzgerald loosely modelled two of his fictional characters on Tommy Hitchcock, Jr.: Tom Buchanan in The Great Gatsby (1925) and Tommy Barban in Tender Is the Night (1934).

The Oxford University Polo Club also appears in the film Transformers: The Last Knight (2017), in a polo match scene against its Cambridge rivals.

== Notable players and alumni ==
- Walter Long, 1st Viscount Long, Christ Church (1854–1924)
- William Cavendish-Bentinck, 6th Duke of Portland, Christ Church (1857–1943)
- Thomas Hitchcock, Sr., Brasenose (1860–1941)
- Douglas Haig, 1st Earl Haig, Brasenose (1861–1928)
- Charles Trefusis, 21st Baron Clinton, Christ Church (1863–1957)
- Piers Alexander, Viscount Valletort, Christ Church (1865–1944)
- Simon Fraser, 14th Lord Lovat, Magdalen (1871–1933)
- George Child Villiers, 8th Earl of Jersey, Balliol (1873–1923)
- Patteson Womersley Nickalls, New College (1877–1946)
- Charles Duncombe, 2nd Earl of Feversham, Christ Church (1879–1916)
- Waldorf Astor, 2nd Viscount Astor, New College (1879–1952)
- Thomas Agar-Robartes, Christ Church (1880–1915)
- Robert Hudson, 1st Viscount Hudson, Magdalen (1880–1957)
- Devereux Milburn, Lincoln (1881–1942)
- Rajendra Narayan II, Maharaja of Cooch Behar, Christ Church (1882–1913)
- Neil Primrose, New College (1882–1917)
- Harold Pearson, 2nd Viscount Cowdray, Christ Church (1882–1933)
- George Bampfylde, 4th Baron Poltimore, New College (1882–1965)
- Archibald Leslie-Melville, 13th Earl of Leven, Christ Church (1890–1947)
- Prince Serge Obolensky, Christ Church (1890–1978)
- Edward VIII, Magdalen (1894–1972)
- Tommy Hitchcock, Jr., Brasenose (1900–1944)
- Francis Hastings, 16th Earl of Huntingdon, Christ Church (1901–1990)
- Weetman Pearson, 3rd Viscount Cowdray, Christ Church (1910–1995)
- Charles Wood, 2nd Earl of Halifax, Christ Church (1912–1980)
- George Petty-Fitzmaurice, 8th Marquess of Lansdowne, Christ Church (1912–1997)
- Arthur Budgett, Christ Church (1916–2011)
- George Haig, 2nd Earl Haig, Christ Church (1918–2009)
- Peter Palumbo, Baron Palumbo, Worcester (b. 1935)
- Arturo Goetz, Jesus (1944–2014)
- Claire Tomlinson, Somerville (1944–2022)
- Prince Hassan bin Talal, Christ Church (b. 1947)
- Redmond Watt, Christ Church (b. 1950)
- Sultan Abdullah of Pahang, Worcester (b. 1959)
- Richard Rowley, Exeter (b. 1959)
- Allanah Weston, Merton (b. 1972)
- François Perrodo, St Peter's (b. 1977)
- Lanto Sheridan, Harris Manchester (b. 1988)
- Hon. Richard Vere Harmsworth, St Peter's (b. 1994)
