= Puzzle (2018 film) =

American drama film by Marc Turtletaub

- Theatrical release poster
- Directed by: Marc Turtletaub
- Written by: Oren Moverman; Polly Mann
- Based on: Rompecabezas by Natalia Smirnoff
- Produced by: Wren Arthur; Guy Stodel; Marc Turtletaub; Peter Saraf
- Starring: Kelly Macdonald; Irrfan Khan; David Denman; Bubba Weiler; Austin Abrams; Liv Hewson
- Cinematography: Chris Norr
- Edited by: Catherine Haight
- Music by: Dustin O'Halloran
- Production companies: Big Beach; Olive Productions
- Distributed by: Sony Pictures Classics
- Release dates: January 23, 2018 (Sundance); July 27, 2018 (United States)
- Running time: 103 minutes
- Country: United States
- Language: English
- Box office: $2.3 million

Puzzle is a 2018 American drama film directed by Marc Turtletaub and written by Oren Moverman and Polly Mann, based on the 2010 Argentine film of the same name. It stars Kelly Macdonald, Irrfan Khan (in his final English-language role before his death on April 29, 2020), David Denman, Bubba Weiler, Austin Abrams, Liv Hewson, and follows a stay-at-home mother who enters a puzzle building competition. The film premiered at the 2018 Sundance Film Festival. Sony Pictures Classics then acquired the worldwide rights to the film, and released it on July 27, 2018.

== Plot ==
Agnes is a middle-class suburban homemaker and mother of two grown sons, Ziggy and Gabe, who seems stuck with her husband Louie in a monotonous routine. She serves her family devotedly and without argument. After baking her own cake, and serving and cleaning up after her own birthday party, she finds herself drawn to a 1000 piece jigsaw puzzle among all the gifts she received. She likes it so much she travels to New York City to visit a shop where she can find more complex puzzles.

At the shop Agnes notices an advertisement which leads her to Robert, a former puzzle tournament champion who is looking for a new partner to compete in a championship tournament the following month. Robert is a wealthy and reclusive inventor whose wife (who was also his puzzle partner) has recently left him. Agnes is intrigued by their differences whereas Robert is surprised by Agnes’ unorthodox approach for solving puzzles and considers her as a Godsend. Robert asks her to meet him twice a week in order to prepare for the national tournament.

Agnes tells her family she needs to help an aunt who has broken her leg, lying every day while trying to help her eldest son discern what kind of life he really wants. She is frustrated by her husband's resistance and shocks her family as she begins to assert herself, declaring that she is going to the tournament. She keeps her relationship with Robert secret as she falls in love with him.

On the last day of practice, Agnes and Robert end up in bed together. As a result, she is late returning home and, on her arrival, Louie finally confronts her asking whether she's having an affair. Agnes confesses she had sex with her puzzle partner (Robert). The next day, the day of the tournament, Ziggy cooks breakfast for her. Agnes and Robert win the national tournament. Agnes breaks the news of her success to her sons but doesn't tell them she has to leave for Brussels soon to compete in the World Jigsaw Puzzle Tournament.

Agnes, along with both her sons and Gabe's girlfriend Nicki, goes to the family's old vacation home, which Louie has agreed to sell so the boys can pursue their dreams. There, Agnes calls Robert. Robert reminds her of the flight for Brussels they have to catch. Agnes informs Robert that she is not coming to the international championship. Instead, she boards a train to Montreal, going her own way.

== Cast ==
- Kelly Macdonald as Agnes, Louie's wife and mother to Ziggy and Gabe
- Irrfan Khan as Robert, Agnes’ puzzle partner
- David Denman as Louie, Agnes’ husband and Ziggy and Gabe's father
- Bubba Weiler as Ziggy, Agnes and Louie's older son and Gabe's brother
- Austin Abrams as Gabe, Agnes and Louie's younger son and Ziggy's brother and Nicki's boyfriend
- Liv Hewson as Nicki, Gabe's girlfriend

== Release ==
The film had its world premiere at the Sundance Film Festival on January 23, 2018. Shortly after, Sony Pictures Classics acquired worldwide distribution rights to the film for $5 million, releasing it in the United States on July 27, 2018. Its release for Blu-ray and DVD sales took place on November 13, 2018, by Sony Pictures Home Entertainment.

== Reception ==
=== Box office ===
Puzzle grossed $2 million in the United States and Canada and $235,611 in other territories for a worldwide total of $2.3 million, in addition to $19,979 from home video sales.

=== Critical response ===
On review aggregator Rotten Tomatoes, the film holds an approval rating of 82% based on 133 reviews, with an average rating of 7.1/10. The website's critical consensus reads: "Puzzle transcends its quirky premise with honest emotion – and Kelly Macdonald, whose nicely understated performance proves she's too often underutilized." On Metacritic, it holds a weighted average score of 66 out of 100, based on 36 critics, indicating "generally favorable reviews".

Peter Debruge from Variety described the remake of the well-liked Argentine film as a way for "Kelly Macdonald to shine amid the yawn-inducing world of competitive jigsaw puzzling". Kate Erbland from IndieWire gave film a grade of "B+" and said that Macdonald "excels in the rare drama that follows a woman's own journey to self-actualization", and that the film "toes a tough line, managing to stay relentlessly good-hearted and deeply humane, even as Agnes herself plunges into deeper, more dramatic waters".

Jordan Ruimy from The Playlist said that the film takes its time "to let its characters breathe, building up a beautiful atmosphere filled with richly lit, eye-melting shots" by Norr. He noted that the script is eventually complicated by "a struggle to tie things up, if they should be tied-up at all".
