= In the Future =

In the Future may refer to:

- In the Future (album), a 2008 album by Black Mountain
- In the Future (2010 film), an Argentine documentary film
- In the Future (1932 film), an Australian short film
- "In the Future", a song by Bill Wurtz
