= The Varsity Polo Match =

Annual university polo match between Oxford and Cambridge

The Varsity Polo Match The La Martina Varsity Polo Match
- The Challenge Cup, presented in 1920

Tournament information
- Sport: Polo
- Established: 27 November 1878; 147 years ago
- Venue: Guards Polo Club, Windsor
- Participants: Cambridge University Polo Club (CUPC) and Oxford University Polo Club (OUPC)

Tournament statistics
- Largest margin of victory: Oxford, 19–0 (2016)
- Current sponsor: La Martina
- Trophy: The Challenge Cup, presented by the Hurlingham Club in 1920

Current champion
- Oxford

The Varsity Polo Match is an annual polo match between the Oxford University Polo Club and the Cambridge University Polo Club, contested by teams of four players. Established in 1878, it was historically known as the Inter-University Challenge Cup or the Inter-Varsity Polo Match.

The competition has also been known as the University Polo Match and under various sponsorship titles. These have included the Champagne Taittinger University Matches (1982), the Krug Champagne Varsity Polo (1984), the Jack Wills Varsity Polo (2007–2014) and, since 2016, the La Martina Varsity Polo Match.

Members of both teams are traditionally known as Blues, with Oxford represented by dark blue and Cambridge by light blue.

The match is held annually, usually in early June at Guards Polo Club. Attendance has historically ranged from approximately 500 to 5,000 spectators, with royal participation contributing to particularly large crowds.

In the most recent Varsity Match, held on 30 May 2026, Oxford defeated Cambridge 12–0. As of 2026, Oxford leads the overall series with 70 victories to Cambridge's 57.

== History ==
The Varsity Polo Match is the second-oldest surviving polo fixture, preceded only by the inter-regimental match, which was established seven years earlier. First played in 1878, the competition has traditionally been held annually, with interruptions during the two World Wars and in 1894, 1900, 1960–1961, 1963 and 2020.

Originally, the match took place at the Hurlingham Club on the Monday following Ascot. Following the Second World War, matches were held at Woolmers Park and Cowdray Park. From 1962 onwards, the venue alternated annually between Cambridge and Kirtlington Park Polo Club near Oxford, which had become the home ground of the Oxford University Polo Club in 1954. Since 1994, the Varsity Match has generally been held at Guards Polo Club.

The match is contested for the Challenge Cup, presented by the Hurlingham Club in 1920.

== Competitors ==
The Varsity Match is unusual in that it is traditionally played open, meaning that handicaps are not taken into account. The competition also permits mixed-gender teams, a relatively uncommon feature among the Blues sports of both universities.

The original eligibility requirements and match conditions were recorded as follows:

No player eligible who has been a member of his University for more than four years, or who has not been in residence during the term in which the match takes place. Instituted in 1878. Played generally at Hurlingham, in June. (Modern Polo, 1896)

No player eligible who has been a member of his University for more than four years, or who has not been in residence during the term in which the match takes place. The Cup shall be held by the winning University in each year until May 1st in the succeeding year, when it shall be returned to The Hurlingham Club. Play – 6 periods. (The Polo Yearbook 1939)

== Old Blues Match ==
The Prince of Wales playing for the Old Oxonians on Varsity Day in July 1922.

The Varsity Match is traditionally preceded by a match between the Old Blues teams of Oxford and Cambridge. Like the Varsity Match itself, it is an annual fixture, with records dating back to 1879, although significant gaps remain in the historical record. Originally known as the Old Oxonians vs Old Cantabs match, it brings together former players from both universities.

Historically, both teams played an important role in promoting British polo, competing not only on Varsity Day but also in other tournaments and events. They were regarded as among the strongest teams in British polo until the Second World War brought an end to this period of prominence.

== Results and statistics ==
A selection of notable Varsity Match statistics includes:

- Total victories: Oxford, 70; Cambridge, 57
- Most consecutive victories: Oxford, 11 (2015–2026)
- Largest margin of victory: Oxford, 19–0 (2016)

=== Full results by year ===
No.	Date	Venue	Winner	Score	Oxford wins	Cambridge wins	Old Blues Match
1	27 November 1878	Oxford	Oxford	5–0	1	0	
2	14 June 1879	Hurlingham	Cambridge	1–2	1	1	Oxonians
3	29 May 1880	Hurlingham	Oxford	4–1	2	1	Draw
4	18 June 1881	Hurlingham	Cambridge	0–3	2	2	
5	17/ 22 June 1882^{[a]}	Hurlingham	Cambridge	2–3	2	3	
6	16 June 1883	Hurlingham	Oxford	4–1	3	3	
7	14 June 1884	Hurlingham	Cambridge	2–4	3	4	Oxonians
8	20 June 1885	Hurlingham	Oxford	4–0	4	4	
9	12 June 1886	Hurlingham	Oxford	8–2	5	4	
10	18 June 1887	Hurlingham	Cambridge	6–7	5	5	
11	16 June 1888	Hurlingham	Cambridge	2–10	5	6	
12	22 June 1889	Hurlingham	Cambridge	0–7	5	7	
13	28 June 1890	Hurlingham	Oxford	5–4	6	7	
14	20 June 1891	Hurlingham	Oxford	4–1	7	7	
15	29 June 1892	Hurlingham	Cambridge	1–12	7	8	
16	1 July 1893; 1894 no match	Hurlingham	Cambridge	1–6	7	9	
17	14 June 1895	Oxford	Cambridge	1–8	7	10	
18	22 June 1896	Oxford	Cambridge	3–5	7	11	
19	8 June 1897	Hurlingham	Oxford	12–0	8	11	
20	13 June 1898	Hurlingham	Oxford	15–0	9	11	
21	12 June 1899; 1900 no match	Hurlingham	Oxford	11–1	10	11	
22	24 June 1901	Hurlingham	Oxford	8–2	11	11	
23	23 June 1902	Oxford	Oxford	14–0	12	11	
24	20 June 1903	Hurlingham	Oxford	14–1	13	11	Cantabs
25	20 June 1904	Hurlingham	Cambridge	3–4	13	12	
26	26 June 1905	Hurlingham	Cambridge	4–9	13	13	
27	25 June 1906	Hurlingham	Oxford	4–3	14	13	
28	24 June 1907	Hurlingham	Cambridge	2–9	14	14	
29	29 June 1908	Hurlingham	Cambridge	1–6	14	15	
30	1 July 1909	Wembley Park	Cambridge	4–5	14	16	
31	29 June 1910	Hurlingham	Oxford	10–2	15	16	
32	30 June 1911	Roehampton	Cambridge	3–8	15	17	
33	3 July 1912	Hurlingham	Oxford	6–5	16	17	
34	21 June 1913	Hurlingham	Oxford	9–5	17	17	
35	20 June 1914; 1915–1919 no match	Hurlingham	Oxford	19–1	18	17	
36	19 June 1920	Hurlingham	Cambridge	3–4	18	18	
37	23 June 1921	Hurlingham	Cambridge	4–7	18	19	
38	24 June 1922	Hurlingham	Cambridge	1–5	18	20	Cantabs
39	23 June 1923	Hurlingham	Cambridge	3–6	18	21	Oxonians
40	21 June 1924	Hurlingham	Oxford	7–5	19	21	Cantabs
41	4 July 1925	Hurlingham	Cambridge	2–8	19	22	
42	17 July 1926	Hurlingham	Cambridge	4–7	19	23	
43	13 July 1927	Hurlingham	Oxford	8–3	20	23	
44	12 July 1928	Hurlingham	Cambridge	2–3	20	24	
45	11 July 1929	Hurlingham	Cambridge	4–5	20	25	
46	10 July 1930	Hurlingham	Cambridge	4–5	20	26	
47	9 July 1931	Hurlingham	Oxford	9–0	21	26	
48	7 July 1932	Hurlingham	Oxford	11–0	22	26	
49	15 July 1933	Hurlingham	Oxford	6–4	23	26	
50	12 July 1934	Hurlingham	Oxford	5–3	24	26	
51	11 July 1935	Hurlingham	Cambridge	4–5	24	27	
52	4 July 1936	Hurlingham	Oxford	4–1	25	27	
53	10 July 1937	Hurlingham	Oxford	12–0	26	27	
54	8 July 1938	Hurlingham	Oxford	8–4	27	27	
55	9 July 1939; 1940–1950 no match	Hurlingham	Cambridge	4,5–5	27	28	
56	30 June 1951	Woolmers Park	Oxford	6–0	28	28	
57	9 June 1952	Henley (Friar Park)	Cambridge	0–9	28	29	
58	24 May 1953	Woolmers Park	Cambridge	0–4	28	30	
59	20 June 1954	Woolmers Park	Cambridge	2–8	28	31	
60	18 June 1955	Windsor Park	Oxford	3–2	29	31	
61	23 June 1956	Windsor Park	Oxford	5–1	30	31	
62	22 June 1957	Windsor Park	Cambridge	2–4	30	32	
63	21 June 1958	Windsor Park	Oxford	6–5	31	32	
64	30 June 1959; 1960–1961 no match	Cowdray Park	Cambridge	1–4	31	33	
65	30 June 1962; 1963 no match	Cowdray Park	Cambridge	4–5	31	34	
66	6 June 1964	Windsor Park	Oxford	5–3	32	34	
67	13 June 1965	Woolmers Park	Cambridge	6–7	32	35	
68	19 June 1966	Kirtlington	Oxford	7–0	33	35	
69	18 June 1967	Kirtlington	Oxford	12–1	34	35	
70	9 June 1968	Kirtlington	Oxford	2–1	35	35	
71	8 June 1969	Woolmers Park	Oxford	4–1	36	35	
72	7 June 1970	Kirtlington	Oxford	5–0	37	35	
73	6 June 1971	Woolmers Park	Oxford	3–2	38	35	
74	4 June 1972	Kirtlington	Oxford	11–1	39	35	
75	17 June 1973	Woolmers Park	Oxford	5–2	40	35	
76	9 June 1974	Kirtlington	Cambridge	3–4	40	36	
77	8 June 1975	Woolmers Park	Cambridge	2–5	40	37	
78	13 June 1976	Kirtlington	Oxford	2–1	41	37	
79	12 June 1977	Woolmers Park	Cambridge	2–3	41	38	
80	26 May 1978	Kirtlington	Cambridge	2–3	41	39	Oxonians
81	1979	Kirtlington	Cambridge	3–4	41	40	Oxonians
82	17 May 1980	Kirtlington	Oxford	11–1	42	40	Draw
83	14 June 1981	Carver Barracks, Saffron Walden	Oxford	4–2	43	40	
84	13 June 1982	Kirtlington	Oxford	8–1	44	40	Oxonians
85	12 June 1983	Kirtlington	Oxford	7–0	45	40	Cantabs
86	9 June 1984	Kirtlington	Cambridge	3–6	45	41	Oxonians
87	23 June 1985	Rutland	Cambridge	4–5	45	42	
88	7 June 1986	Kirtlington Park	Oxford	7–1	46	42	Cantabs
89	7 June 1987	Rutland Polo Club	Cambridge	2–3	46	43	
90	5 June 1988	Kirtlington Park	Cambridge	2–5	46	44	Oxonians
91	18 June 1989	Kirtlington Park	Oxford	2–1	47	44	
92	17 June 1990	Cambridge & Newmarket	Cambridge	1–4	47	45	Oxonians
93	16 June 1991	Cambridge & Newmarket	Cambridge	2–4	47	46	
94	14 June 1992	Kirtlington Park	Oxford	3–2	48	46	Oxonians
95	13 June 1993	Cambridge & Newmarket	Oxford	10–2	49	46	
96	11 June 1994	Guards	Cambridge	1–2	49	47	Oxonians
97	11 June 1995	Cambridge & Newmarket	Cambridge	3–5	49	48	Oxonians
98	16 June 1996	Guards	Cambridge	2–7	49	49	Oxonians
99	15 June 1997	Guards	Cambridge	5–6	49	50	Oxonians
100	6 June 1998	Guards	Cambridge	1–13	49	51	Oxonians
101	5 June 1999	Guards	Cambridge	2–4	49	52	
102	10 June 2000	Guards	Oxford	6–0	50	52	Cantabs
103	10 June 2001	Cambridge & Newmarket	Cambridge	1–3	50	53	Cantabs
104	8 June 2002	Guards	Cambridge	3–4	50	54	cancelled
105	7 June 2003	Guards	Oxford	6–0	51	54	Oxonians
106	5 June 2004	Guards	Oxford	5–4	52	54	Oxonians
107	4 June 2005	Guards	Oxford	12–2	53	54	Cantabs
108	3 June 2006	Guards	Cambridge	1–6	53	55	Cantabs
109	9 June 2007	Guards	Oxford	9–5	54	55	Oxonians
110	7 June 2008	Guards	Oxford	4–0	55	55	
111	7 June 2009	Kirtlington Park	Oxford	5–4	56	55	Oxonians
112	12 June 2010	Guards	Oxford	5–4	57	55	Oxonians
113	11 June 2011	Guards	Oxford	5–4	58	55	Oxonians
114	9 June 2012	Guards	Cambridge	2–13	58	56	Cantabs
115	8 June 2013	Guards	Oxford	11–3	59	56	Cantabs
116	7 June 2014	Guards	Cambridge	3–6	59	57	Oxonians
117	7 June 2015	Guards	Oxford	14–2	60	57	Oxonians
118	4 June 2016	Guards	Oxford	19–0	61	57	Oxonians
119	3 June 2017	Guards	Oxford	5–1	62	57	Cantabs
120	2 June 2018	Guards	Oxford	13–0	63	57	Cantabs
121	1 June 2019; 2020 no match	Guards	Oxford	15–1	64	57	Oxonians
122	5 June 2021	Guards	Oxford	8–3	65	57	Oxonians
123	4 June 2022	Guards	Oxford	8–2	66	57	Cantabs
124	10 June 2023	Guards	Oxford	7–5	67	57	Cantabs
125	1 June 2024	Guards	Oxford	5–3	68	57	Cantabs
126	30 May 2025	Guards	Oxford	5–2	69	57	Cantabs
127	30 May 2026	Guards	Oxford	12–0	70	57	Oxonians

a. At the call of time the score was still one goal all, so the teams met again at Hurlingham a few days later, when Cambridge won by 3 goals to 2.

== Notable players ==
- Walter Long, 1st Viscount Long, Oxford (1854–1924)
- Thomas Hitchcock Sr., Oxford (1860–1941)
- Douglas Haig, 1st Earl Haig, Oxford (1861–1928)
- Walter Buckmaster, Cambridge (1872–1942)
- Frederick Freake, Cambridge (1876–50)
- Patteson Womersley Nickalls, Oxford (1877–1946)
- Devereux Milburn, Oxford (1881–1942)
- Harold Pearson, 2nd Viscount Cowdray, Oxford (1882–1933)
- John Wodehouse, 3rd Earl of Kimberley, Cambridge (1883–1941)
- Prince Henry, Duke of Gloucester, Cambridge (1900–1970)
- Weetman Pearson, 3rd Viscount Cowdray, Oxford (1910–1995)
- George Haig, 2nd Earl Haig, Oxford (1918–2009)
- Claire Tomlinson, Oxford (1944–2022)
- Charles III, Cambridge (b. 1948)
- Redmond Watt, Oxford (b. 1950)
- Lanto Sheridan, Oxford (b. 1988)

== See also ==
- List of British and Irish varsity matches
- Oxford–Cambridge rivalry
