= No Return (2010 film) =

- Spanish theatrical release poster
- Spanish: Sin retorno
- Directed by: Miguel Cohan
- Written by: Ana Cohan; Miguel Cohan
- Produced by: Mariela Besuievsky; Gerardo Herrero; Vannessa Ragone
- Starring: Leonardo Sbaraglia; Martín Slipak; Bárbara Goenaga; Federico Luppi; Luis Machín; Ana Celentano; Arturo Goetz; Agustín Vásquez; Felipe Villanueva; Rocío Muñoz; Antonia Bengoechea
- Cinematography: Hugo Colace
- Edited by: Fernando Pardo
- Music by: Lucio Godoy
- Production companies: Haddock Films; Tornasol Films; Castafiore Films
- Distributed by: Distribution Co. (ar); Alta Classics (es)
- Release dates: 30 September 2010 (Argentina); 18 February 2011 (Spain)
- Countries: Spain; Argentina
- Language: Spanish

No Return (Spanish: Sin retorno) is a 2010 Spanish-Argentine thriller drama film directed by Miguel Cohan which stars Leonardo Sbaraglia, Martín Slipak and Bárbara Goenaga alongside Federico Luppi.

== Plot ==
The plot tracks the developments after a cyclist (Pablo) is hit by a car with young Matías and Chaucha inside. Pablo's father Víctor looks for witnesses and ventriloquist Federico eventually gets wrongfully jailed.

== Cast ==
- Leonardo Sbaraglia as Federico Samaniego
- Martín Slipak as Matías Fustiniano
- Bárbara Goenaga as Natalia Kaufman
- Federico Luppi as Víctor Marchetti
- Luis Machín as Ricardo Fustiniano
- Ana Celentano as Laura
- Arturo Goetz as Liquidador
- Agustín Vásquez as Pablo Marchetti
- Felipe Villanueva as Chaucha
- Rocío Muñoz as Luciana
- Antonia Bengoechea as Malena Samaniego
- Claudia Cantero as Fiscal
- Mariano Fabricante as Secretario Fiscal

== Production ==
A joint Spanish-Argentine co-production, the film was produced by Haddock Films, Tornasol Films and Castafiore Films in association with Telefe and Arena Films. Shooting locations included Buenos Aires and Alicante.

== Release ==
The film premiered in Argentine theatres on 30 September 2010. It entered the Valladolid International Film Festival's main competition on 27 October 2010, followed by a theatrical release in Spain on 18 February 2011, distributed by Alta Classics.

== Reception ==
Fernando López of La Nación gave a positive review ("good"), writing that the "solid debut" film by Miguel Cohan featured "no gimmicks, no appeals to easy emotion, no sobering speeches, no underlinings", and "no manichaeism in the portrayal of characters", whereas the elaborate screenplay (perhaps "overly elaborate") deals with the likes of "guilt, hypocrisy, individualism, irresponsibility".

Jonathan Holland of Variety considered that the story "is explored with sensitivity and craft", "built around a carefully worked-out script", underpinning a "strong calling card for debut helmer Miguel Cohan".

Javier Ocaña of El País considered the film to be a "powerful dramatic thriller that deals with all angles of an unintentional criminal event", featuring a "superb use of ellipses" and "good performances".

== Accolades ==
| Year | Award | Category | Nominee(s) | Result | Ref. |
|---|---|---|---|---|---|
| 2010 | 55th Valladolid International Film Festival | Golden Spike | | Won | |
| 2010 | 5th Sur Awards | Best Debut Film | | Won | |
| 2010 | 5th Sur Awards | Best Original Screenplay | Ana Cohan, Miguel Cohan | Nominated | |
| 2010 | 5th Sur Awards | Best Actor | Leonardo Sbaraglia | Nominated | |
| 2010 | 5th Sur Awards | Best Supporting Actress | Ana Celentano | Nominated | |
| 2010 | 5th Sur Awards | Best Supporting Actor | Martín Slipak | Won | |
| 2010 | 5th Sur Awards | Best New Actor | Martín Slipak | Nominated | |

== See also ==
- List of Argentine films of 2010
- List of Spanish films of 2011
