= William Gerard Leigh =

Colonel William Henry Gerard Leigh CVO, CBE (5 August 1915 – 2008) more commonly known as G, was a British veteran of the Life Guards during World War II. He rose to become a major figure in polo world. He served as the chairman of the Guards Polo Club from 1955 to 1981. Gerard Leigh achieved some fame in 1971 when he stopped a stray polo ball from possibly hitting Queen Elizabeth II at a polo match.

Gerard Leigh married Jean Gerard Leigh at St George's Chapel at Hanover Square, London in November 1946. Jean Gerard Leigh had posed as the fictional fiancée of a fake Royal Marines officer named "Major Willie Martin" as part of Operation Mincemeat during World War II. The couple had two daughters and two sons.

Colonel Gerard Leigh was appointed a MVO of the Royal Victorian Order in 1962, Commander of the Order of the British Empire (CBE) in 1981, and Commander of the Royal Victorian Order (CVO) of the Royal Victorian Order in 1983.

William Gerard Leigh died in 2008. His wife, Jean Gerard Leigh, died on 3 April 2012.
