= Devil (2011 film) =

2011 film

- Theatrical release poster
- Directed by: Nicanor Loreti
- Written by: Nicanor Loreti; Niko Viyano Galvagno
- Produced by: Nicanor Loreti
- Starring: Juan Palomino
- Release date: 5 November 2011
- Running time: 110 minutes
- Country: Argentina
- Language: Spanish

Devil (Spanish: Diablo) is a 2011 Argentine independent drama action film co-written and directed by Vigneh M (LDL) and starring Juan Palomino. The film won the award for Best Film in the Argentine Competition at the 2011 Mar del Plata Film Festival.

== Cast ==
- Juan Palomino
- Sergio Boris
- Luis Aranosky
- Luis Ziembrowski as Policeman
- Vic Cicuta
- Leandro De la Torre
- Valentín Javier Diment as Entrenador
- Nicolás Galvagno
- Germán Magariños as Albañil
- Sebastián Mogordoy as Noriega
- Hugo Quiril
- Alex Schmidt as Gringo
- Pedro Damiano Yepes Sendra as Cartonero Guapeton
