= Lock Charmer =

- Sundance film poster
- Directed by: Natalia Smirnoff
- Written by: Natalia Smirnoff
- Produced by: Juan Pablo Miller
- Starring: Esteban Lamothe; Érica Rivas; Yosiria Huaripata; Sergio Boris
- Cinematography: Guillermo Nieto
- Edited by: Delfina Castagnino
- Music by: Alejandro Franov
- Production company: Memento Films
- Release date: January 21, 2014 (Sundance Film Festival)
- Running time: 77 minutes
- Country: Argentina
- Language: Spanish

Lock Charmer (Spanish: El cerrajero) is a 2014 Argentine drama film written and directed by Natalia Smirnoff. The film premiered in-competition in the World Cinema Dramatic Competition at 2014 Sundance Film Festival on January 21, 2014.

The film later premiered at the 2014 Fribourg International Film Festival on March 29, 2014.

== Plot ==
Thirty-three-year-old locksmith, Sebastian doesn't believe in committed relationships. He learns from his recent girlfriend, Monica, that she's pregnant but she isn't sure that he is the father. During the same time, he discovers that whenever he fixes someones locks, he gets a vision into their lives, which reveals their feelings. Soon this power starts to complicate his life. After he warns a maid named Daisy that her boyfriend is stealing from her boss, she leaves her boyfriend, and Sebastian takes her in. But when he sees a vision about his own life, Sebastian is forced to examine every aspect of his life.

== Cast ==
- Esteban Lamothe as Sebastian
- Érica Rivas as Monica
- Yosiria Huaripata as Daisy
- Sergio Boris as Sebastian's father
- Arturo Goetz
- María Onetto
- Luis Ziembrowski
- Germán de Silva
- Nahuel Mutti
- Claudia Cantero

== Reception ==
Lock Charmer received positive reviews upon its premiere at the 2014 Sundance Film Festival. Geoff Berkshire of Variety, said in his review that "Natalia Smirnoff's second feature is a wisp of melancholy comedy with a dose of magical realism." Boyd van Hoeij in his review for The Hollywood Reporter called the film "A modest but quite charming feature about an Argentinean locksmith who unlocks truths about the lives of his clients." Eric Kohn from Indiewire praised the film by saying that "Measured and never indulgent in its depiction of the plot's mystical ingredients, “Lock Charmer” does a great job at blending two genres and placing them in the strangeness of the 2008 setting" and praised the performances of Lamothe and Huaripata that "Lamothe portrays the locksmith as a man at once perturbed by the behavior of the women in his life and resentful towards his male role model — namely, his estranged father. The natural chemistry between him and Huaripata, as Daisy, matches the efficiency of the movie's direction."

== Accolades ==
| Year | Award | Category | Recipient | Result |
|---|---|---|---|---|
| 2014 | Sundance Film Festival | World Cinema Grand Jury Prize: Dramatic | Natalia Smirnoff | Nominated |
| 2014 | Fribourg International Film Festival | Grand Prix | Natalia Smirnoff | Nominated |
