= Cambridge University Polo Club =

Oldest surviving polo club in Europe

- School: University of Cambridge
- Founded: 1873
- Location: Cambridge, England
- Home ground: Cambridge Polo Club, Haggis Farm
- Colors
- President: Alva Markelius and Jessica Chapman
- Chairman: Ravi Tikkoo
- Head coach: Byron Human
- Captain: Tamara Fifield
- Affiliations: Hurlingham Polo Association; SUPA
- Website: www.cupoloclub.com

The Cambridge University Polo Club (often referred to as CUPC) is the Discretionary Full Blue sports club for competitive polo at the University of Cambridge. Founded in 1873, it is the second oldest surviving polo club in Europe and the third oldest in the world. Its annual Varsity Match against Oxford, established in 1878, is the second oldest continuing polo fixture in the western world.

== History ==
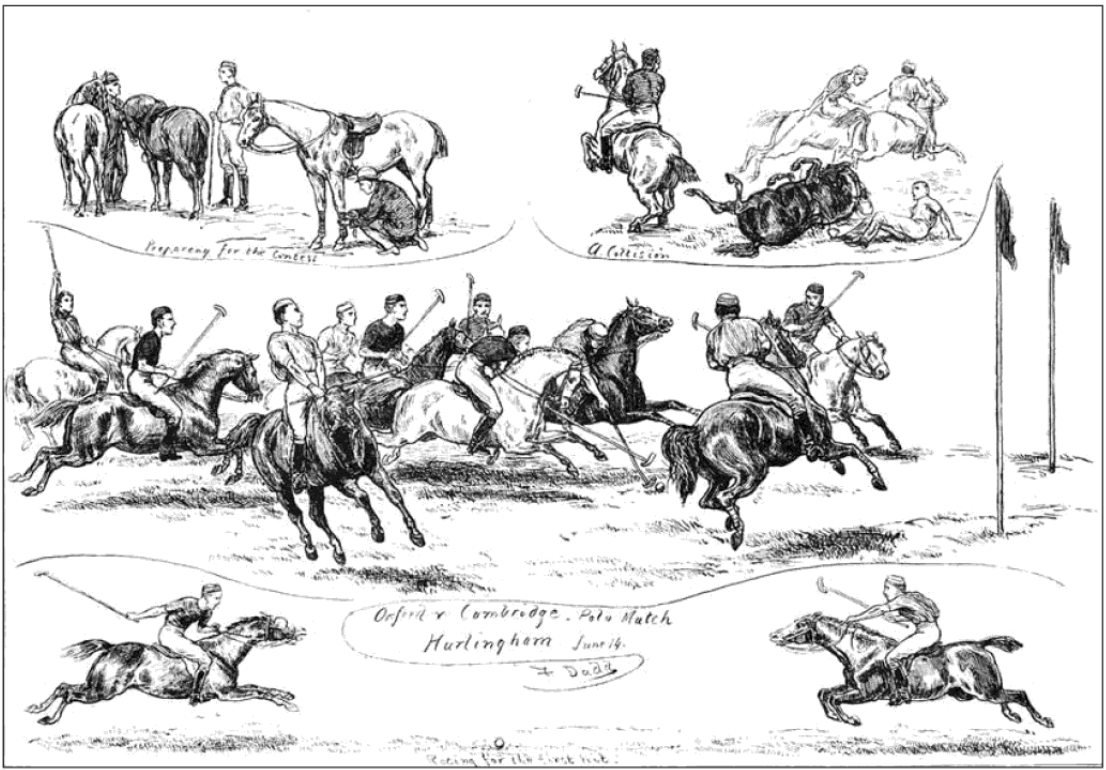
The Varsity Polo Match, by Frank Dadd

The club was founded in 1873 by John Fitzwilliam. Originally, the colours of the club were maroon and yellow and, after some discussions and the sanction of the Cambridge University Boat Club, the following rule was passed : "That the Polo Five be allowed to wear a light blue polo shirt, white forage cap, and belt".

The first inter-university match was held on the Bullingdon Cricket Ground in Cowley, on 27 November 1878. In 1879 the University players felt strong enough to enter a team in the Hurlingham Club's Champion Open Cup, the premier competition of the time. Although they were quickly defeated, the experience served them well and they returned later that year to defeat Oxford in the first Varsity Match.

== Varsity match ==
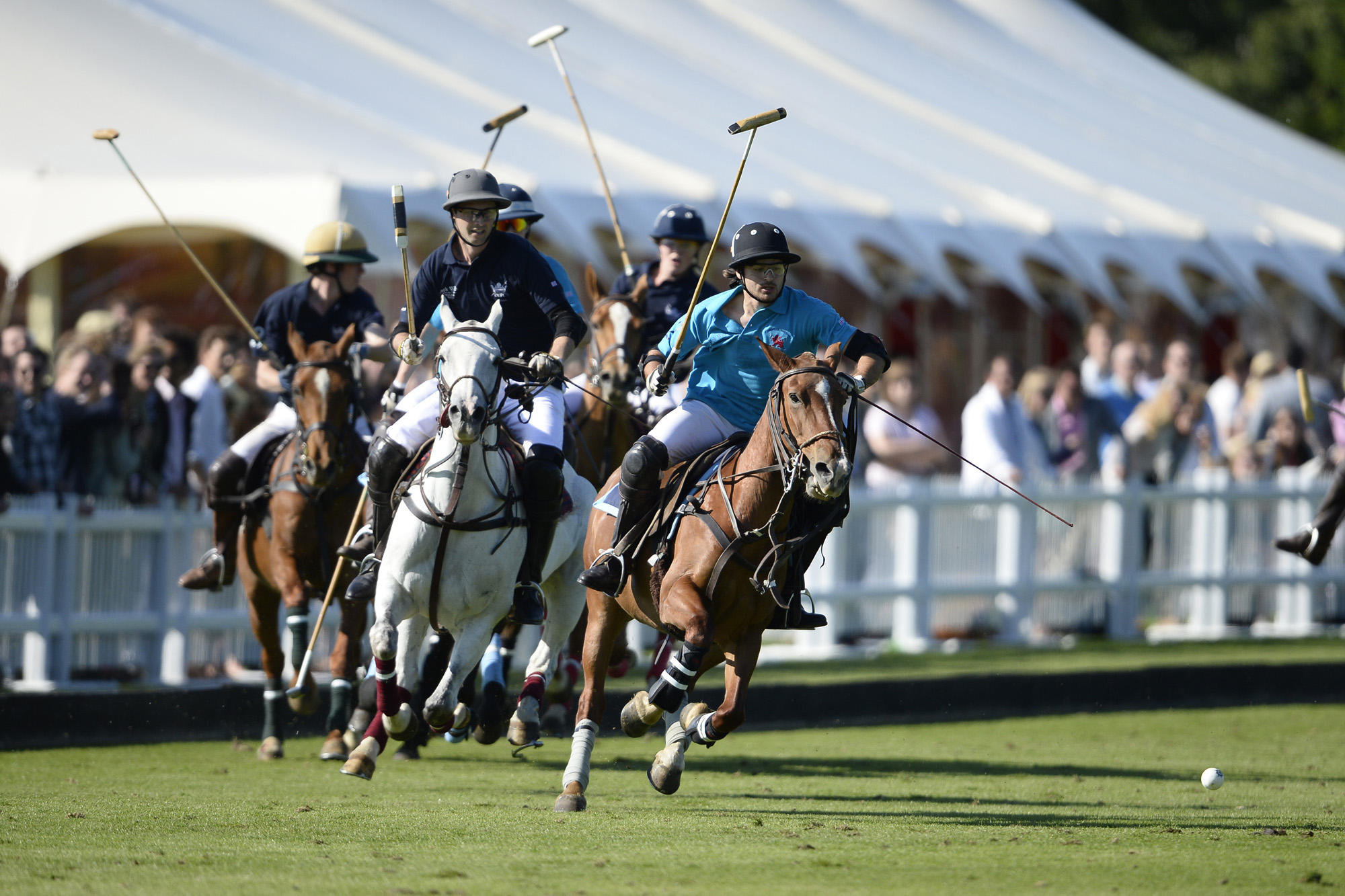
Varsity polo match, 2013

The match format is extremely uncommon as it is traditionally not handicapped. Teams are also mixed, which is a rare opportunity amongst the Cambridge University Blues sports. The original conditions are as follows:

"No player eligible who has been a member of his University for more than four years, or who has not been in residence during the term in which the match takes place. Instituted in 1878. Played generally at Hurlingham, in June."

Currently, polo is a Discretionary Full Blue sport at Cambridge. Oxford and Cambridge take it in turns to host the B-Team and C-Team varsity event on a separate weekend during Lent Term, with the Old Blues match serving as the traditional curtain raiser for Varsity Day. The match is a well-established fixture in the British sporting calendar and is now held at Guards Polo Club.

== Notable players ==
- Walter Buckmaster (1872–1942)
- Frederick Freake (1876–1950)
- John Wodehouse, 3rd Earl of Kimberley (1883–1941)
- Prince Henry, Duke of Gloucester (1900–1970)
- Charles III (b. 1948)
- Stephen Sanford (1898–1977)
- Charles Darley Miller (1868–1951)
- Sir Max Bemrose (1904–1986)
- Vivian Lockett (1880–1962)
- Luke Tomlinson (b. 1977)
- Louis Mountbatten, 1st Earl of Burma (1900–1979)
