= Sergio Boris =

Argentine film actor

Sergio Boris is an Argentine film actor. He is best known for his performances in The Motorcycle Diaries (Diarios de motocicleta) and Lost Embrace (El Abrazo partido).

== Filmography ==
- Just for Today (Sólo por hoy) - 2001
- Animal (Animalada) - 2001
- ¿Sabés nadar? - 2002
- The Motorcycle Diaries (Diarios de motocicleta) - 2004
- Lost Embrace (El Abrazo partido) - 2004
- Whisky Romeo Zulu - 2004
- Solos - 2005
- Meanwhile (Mientras tanto) - 2006
- Lejana, distante - 2006, short
- The Mud Boy (El niño de barro) - 2006
- In the Future (En el futuro) - 2010
- Devil (Diablo) - 2011
- Juan y Eva - 2011
- Everybody Has a Plan (Todos tenemos un plan) - 2012
- The Corporation (La corporación) - 2012
- Lock Charmer (El cerrajero) - 2014
