= Leo's Room =

2009 Uruguayan film

Leo's Room (in Spanish: El Cuarto De Leo) is a 2009 Uruguayan film about a young man coming to terms with his self and sexual identity. Enrique Buchichio directed the film, and Martín Rodríguez starred as Leo.

In the film, Leo meets an acquaintance from school, Caro. He then develops a relationship with a much more confident young man named Seba. Throughout, his small room serves as a refuge, a place of limited privacy, and a metaphor for his reclusive lifestyle.

Venkatesh called the film a "fascinating though slow portal into the protagonist's grappling with sexuality."
