= Kris Niklison =

Argentine artist (born 1966)

- Born: Maria Cristina Niklison; November 12, 1966 (age 59); Buenos Aires, Argentina
- Occupations: Filmmaker, screenwriter, producer, actress
- Notable work: Diletante, Vergel
- Website: www.krisniklison.com

Kris Niklison (Maria Cristina Niklison, November 12, 1966) is an Argentine performance artist.

Her artistic work is characterized by her personal character and visual poetry, manifesting itself in plays, dance shows and recently aéria movies.

She has received awards as an actress, creator and theater director, choreographer and filmmaker around the world.

She was born to Roque Niklison and Bela Jordan in the Recoleta neighborhood of Buenos Aires, Argentina, where she graduated from Jesus Maria and the National School of Dramatic Art. At 22, she embarked on a world tour that left her living in Amsterdam, where she worked with the physical theater company Lady Komedie in Waterzucht and Survival shows, performing in many international festivals and European theaters. She also worked in Amsterdam with directors Peter Greenaway (who starred in the film Prospero's Books and operates Rosa Horse Drama) and Dario Fo in L'Italiana in Algeri Opera.

In 1997, she starred in Pomp Duck and Cirque du Soleil Circumstances in Hamburg, Germany, with its creator, the legendary Ginger Kennedy.

In 1998, she returned to Amsterdam where she founded the physical theater company Kris Niklison & Company, and achieved international success with their shows M / F, Red Roses Red, Dilemma, The Neverlands and is said to Me. The works were presented in theaters and international festivals across more than 20 countries on 4 continents, garnering praise from the international press.

In 2000, she began working in Embu das Artes, Brazil, where she founded the cultural space Casadasartes. In 2006, she returned to Buenos Aires, and began her film career by creating film producer Basata Films (named after the Arabic word for simplicity). Her first production, Diletante, portrays her mother Bela's extraordinary lucidity and anarchic spirit in her old age. It was met with positive reception, garnering praise and rewards.

When Bela was left bedridden by a stroke in 2012, Kris stopped her work for two years to focus on caring for her, but her mother then died on June 14, 2014.

Since resuming her career after her mother's death, Kris is again dedicated to the cinema, dividing her time between Brazil and Argentina. She then produced Vergel, her second feature.

== Theater ==
Kris Niklison pioneered the combination of physical theater, aerial techniques, dance and script in the theaters of the Netherlands; her works became a benchmark of multidisciplinary art during the latter half of the 90s and the first half of 2000s.

== Cinema ==
In 2007, she went to spend time at her family's home at Sauce Viejo, Santa Fe, Argentina, and recorded with her camera the eccentricities of her mother, Bela Jordan, in old age. After collecting this material for more than a year, she published it in the film Diletante, in the competition of Argentine films in the 23rd Mar del Plata Festival. It won that competition, so she extended the film to 35 mm. Ms. Lita Stantic then joined the project, becoming the film's producer. The film was premiered at the Malba on May 4, 2010, and remained in theaters in Buenos Aires until November of the same year (in the Malba, Arteplex, Gaumont cinemas, and in the dressing room of the Muses) and was popular with the Argentine press.

Later, Diletante was presented at a wide variety of international festivals. After it won the award for Best Documentary at the 50th Cartagena Film Festival, Diletante was declared of Cultural Interest by the Senate of the Nation in 2011.

Her second feature, Vergel, won the Incaa-Ancine competition (earning US $250,000 in support for the production of the film) in 2012 and was filmed in Buenos Aires from January to February 2016. The film was produced by Basata Films (Argentina) and Casadasartesfilms (Brazil), starring Camila Morgado, and Maricel Alvarez. Arrigo Barbabe composed the score, Karen Harley edited, Felix Monti gave photographic advice, and Jusid Margarita gave artistic advice. It was released in 2017.

In 2015, she made a trip to India, where she wrote the script of her planned third feature El Barquero. The film is currently in the fundraising stage.
