= Arturo Goetz =

Argentine actor

Arturo L. Goetz (24 June 1944 – 28 July 2014) was an Argentine film actor. He worked in the cinema of Argentina.

He studied for a Doctor of Philosophy degree in economics at Jesus College, Oxford, from 1971 to 1974, and published his findings on Argentine industrialization in 1976. Whilst at Jesus College, he played football for the college team and polo for the university team. After leaving Oxford, he worked as an economist at the United Nations in Geneva, and then at the Food and Agriculture Organization in Rome, where he worked on food security and South-South cooperation. He returned to Argentina in 1982 and established a treaty for South-South cooperation on food security for Latin America (Comite de Acción sobre Seguridad Alimentaria Regional, CASAR) as well as the non-profit Fundación CREAR, promoting development projects in Argentina. He took formal acting lessons after turning 50, having previously acted as an amateur.

== Partial filmography ==
- Cómplices (1998) - Comisario
- El Amateur (aka The Amateur) (1999) - Concejal
- El Camino (aka The Road) (2000) - Francisco Irureta
- Plan (2000, Short)
- Four Aims and Flyin' Shoes (2001) - Gustavo
- The Holy Girl (2004) - Dr. Vesalio
- Cama adentro (aka Live-In Maid) (2004) - Invitado en el Country
- Derecho de familia (aka Family Law) (2006) - Bernardo Perelman
- The Other (aka El Otro) (2007) - Escribano
- El asaltante (aka "The mugger") (2007) - Asaltante
- La Novia errante (2007) - Padre
- El nido vacio (2008) - Dr. Sprivak
- La sangre brota (2008) - Arturo
- The Window (2008) - Médico
- The City of Your Final Destination (2009) - Mrs. Van Euwen's Guest
- En nuestros corazones para siempre (2009)
- Il richiamo (2009) - Dr. Garcia
- El cuarto de Leo (2009) - Juan
- Los condenados (2009) - Raúl
- Rompecabezas (2010) - Roberto
- Sin retorno (2010) - El Liquidador
- Desmadre (2011) - Eduardo
- La Guerra del Cerdo (2012)
- Errata (2012)
- La sublevación (2012)
- Mala (2013) - Marido de Mónica
- Bolishopping (2013)
- Lock Charmer (2014) - Mario
- Ciencias naturales (2014) - Arturo
- Death in Buenos Aires (2014) - Hombre Polo
