= Puzzle (2010 film) =

2010 Argentine film

- Film poster
- Directed by: Natalia Smirnoff
- Written by: Natalia Smirnoff
- Produced by: Gabriel Pastore
- Starring: Maria Onetto
- Cinematography: Bárbara Álvarez
- Edited by: Natacha Valerga
- Release date: 22 April 2010
- Running time: 87 minutes
- Country: Argentina
- Language: Spanish

Puzzle (Spanish: Rompecabezas) is a 2010 Argentine drama film directed by Natalia Smirnoff. It was nominated for the Golden Bear at the 60th Berlin International Film Festival.

== Plot ==
A middle-aged housewife, Maria del Carmen (Maria Onetto), suddenly finds she has a gift for assembling puzzles. Unbeknownst to her husband (Gabriel Goity) and two college-age sons, she begins practicing for a tournament with a man (Arturo Goetz) she met through an ad in a puzzle shop. The thrill "of a woman discovering her special gift and rejoicing in it" is just one of the surprises in store for Maria, as she starts to look differently at the pieces of her life, and to try new things.

== Cast ==
- María Onetto
- Arturo Goetz
- Gabriel Goity
- Henny Trayles
- Mirta Wons

== Reception ==
Critical reception to the film was mostly positive, according to reviews cited at IMDb, with the notable exception of V.A. Musetto in the New York Post who said, "If the plot of the Argentine soaper Puzzle seems familiar, that's because it's nearly identical to the story in the French movie Queen To Play." Comparing this film to Lucrecia Martel's The Headless Woman, in which Maria Onetto starred in 2008, Stephen Holden of The New York Times said, "Although Puzzle is a much smaller, less ambitious film without the ominous political subtext of Ms. Martel's masterwork, its story...has implications about sexual inequality in Argentina's middle class." Holden also notes that Smirnoff served as Martel's casting director on the 2008 film. The A.V. Club says, "its conclusion is pleasing and not at all pat, a portrait of a woman who's learned she deserves to keep some things for herself."

== American remake ==
An American version has been shot in New York City. The film, directed by Marc Turtletaub, stars Kelly Macdonald, Irrfan Khan, and David Denman, based on a script by Oren Moverman.
