= Lanto Sheridan =

English polo player

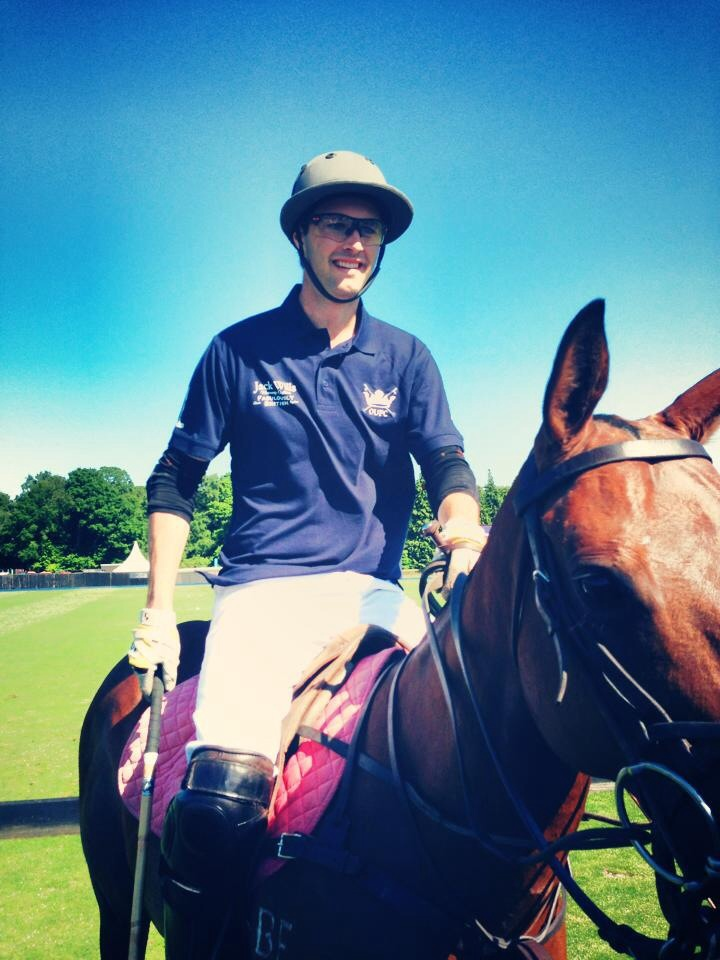
- Sheridan at the Varsity Polo match 2013

Personal information
- Nickname: Lanto
- Nationality: British
- Born: 15 December 1988 (age 37)
- Education: Harris Manchester College, Oxford

Sport
- Sport: Polo
- University team: University of Oxford
- Club: Cowdray Park Polo Club
- Team: Cowdray Vikings
- Updated on 3 August 2013

Lanto Sheridan (born 15 December 1988) is a British polo player with a handicap of 4.

Sheridan started playing polo in the Pony Club at the age of 9, with which he won the Gannon section at the National Championships at Cowdray. He also won the Baileys Horse Feeds Saddle as the Pony Club Polo Player of the Year. Sheridan was educated at Eton College. After leaving school, he played all year round for 5 years, in countries such as Australia, New Zealand, Argentina, Thailand, Barbados, and Dubai. In 2010 he played for the Young England Team.

In 2012 he joined Harris Manchester College, Oxford and since then has been a member of the Oxford University Polo Club. He is the first professional polo player to study at Oxford or Cambridge for an undergraduate degree. He is also the very first student who won an Extraordinary Full Blue in polo at Oxford University.

In the 2013 season he played the 18 and 12 goal tournaments with the Cowdray Vikings, with whom he has played for the last 5 years. He also plays for Clarita in the 15 goal Victor Ludo-rum and with Sport lobster in the 8 and 12 goal at Guards Polo Club.
