= In the Future (2010 film) =

2010 film by Mauro Andrizzi

- Spanish: En el futuro
- Directed by: Mauro Andrizzi
- Written by: Mauro Andrizzi
- Starring: Luis Machín; Sergio Boris; Lorena Damonte
- Cinematography: Emiliano Cativa
- Edited by: Francisco Vazquez Murillo
- Music by: Pontiak; Sportivo Teatral
- Production company: Mono Films
- Release date: September 2010 (Venice)
- Running time: 62 minutes
- Country: Argentina
- Language: French

In the Future (Spanish: En el futuro) is an Argentine documentary film, directed by Mauro Andrizzi and released in 2010. The film dramatizes various short episodes of couples, both heterosexual and gay, sharing moments of physical and emotional intimacy.

The cast includes Luis Machín, Sergio Boris, Lorena Damonte, Carlos Defeo, Débora Dejtiar, Andres Irusta, Felix Bachmann Quadros, Jazmin Antar, Gabriel Lima, Cecilia Czornogas, Casandra Da Cunha, Goyo Anchou, Marina Bacher, Javier Bertolini, Vicente Bustos, Nicole Dubin, Cecilia Elia, Ana Paula Ferrúa, Gina Gattone, Mariano Goldgrob, Jorge Sanabria, María Sureda, Matías Tamborenea, Francisco Vazquez Murillo and Martin Wain.

The film premiered at the 67th Venice International Film Festival, where it was named the winner of the Queer Lion.
