= Natalia Smirnoff =

Argentine film director

- Born: 14 May 1972 (age 54); Buenos Aires, Argentina
- Occupations: Film director Screenwriter
- Years active: 1999–present

Natalia Smirnoff (born 14 May 1972) is an Argentine film director and screenwriter. Her 2010 film Rompecabezas was nominated for the Golden Bear at the 60th Berlin International Film Festival.

== Filmography ==
- Rompecabezas (2010)
- Lock Charmer (2014)
