= Guards Polo Club =

Polo club in Windsor, England

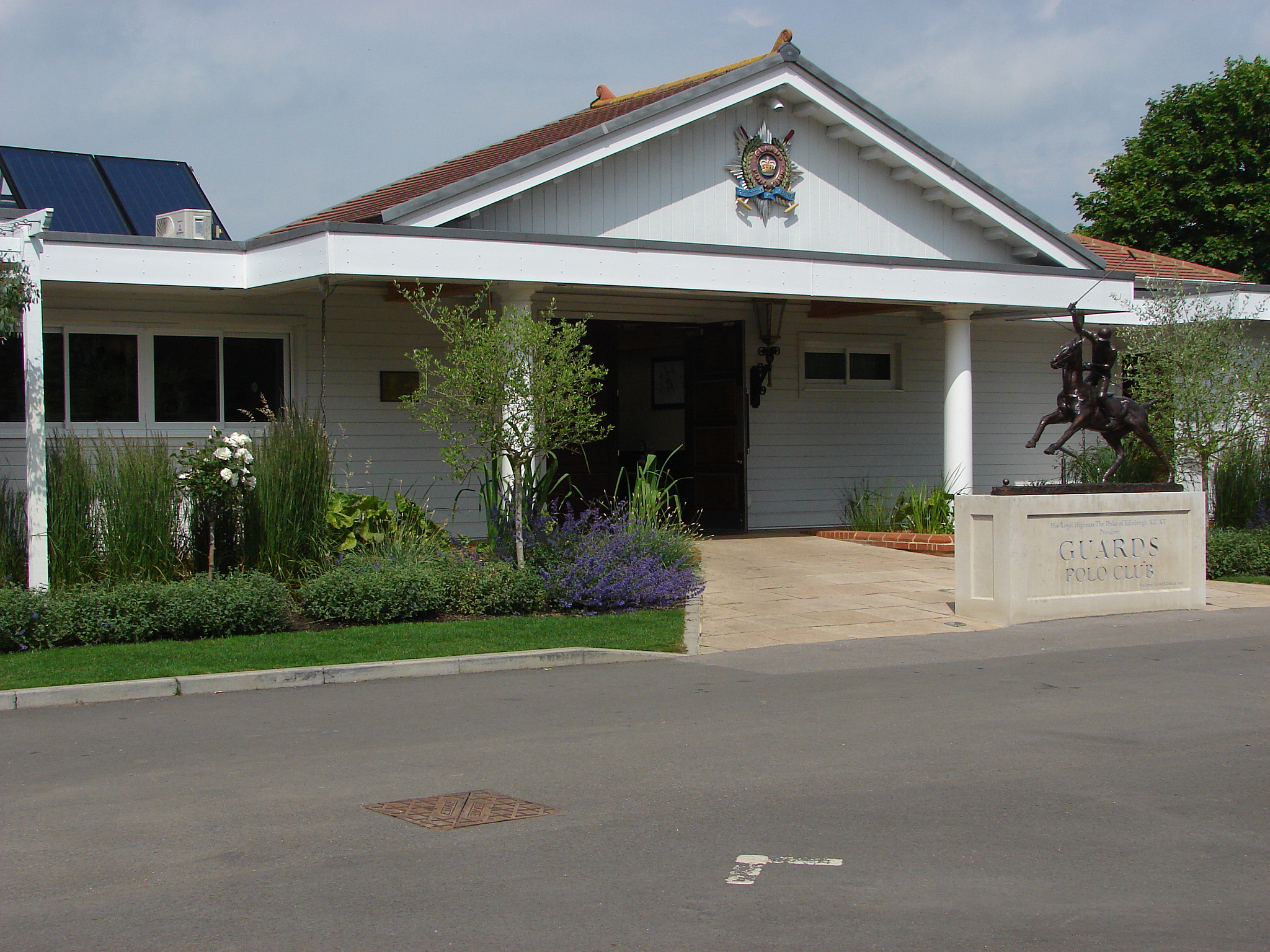

The Guards Polo Club is an English polo club in Windsor, Berkshire. It is closely associated with the British royal family. Prince Philip, Duke of Edinburgh was president of the club from its formation on 25 January 1955 until his death in April 2021. Queen Elizabeth II was its patron. King Charles III was announced as the club's new president in May 2024.

== Overview ==
The Club is based at Smiths Lawn, in Windsor Great Park, which is thought to have been named after a game keeper at the time of the Stuart Restoration. The Club has ten polo pitches on 53 hectares (130 acres) and stables, paddocks and training facilities four miles away at Flemish Farm. The Queen and Prince Philip opened a new, purpose-built clubhouse and Royal box in front of a selection of club members at Smiths Lawn on Sunday 26 April 2009.

Under the 25-year stewardship of Commander of the Household Cavalry Colonel William Gerard Leigh (1915 - 2008) as both player and from 1955, Chairman, the Household Brigade Polo Club changed its name in 1969 to the Guards Polo Club.

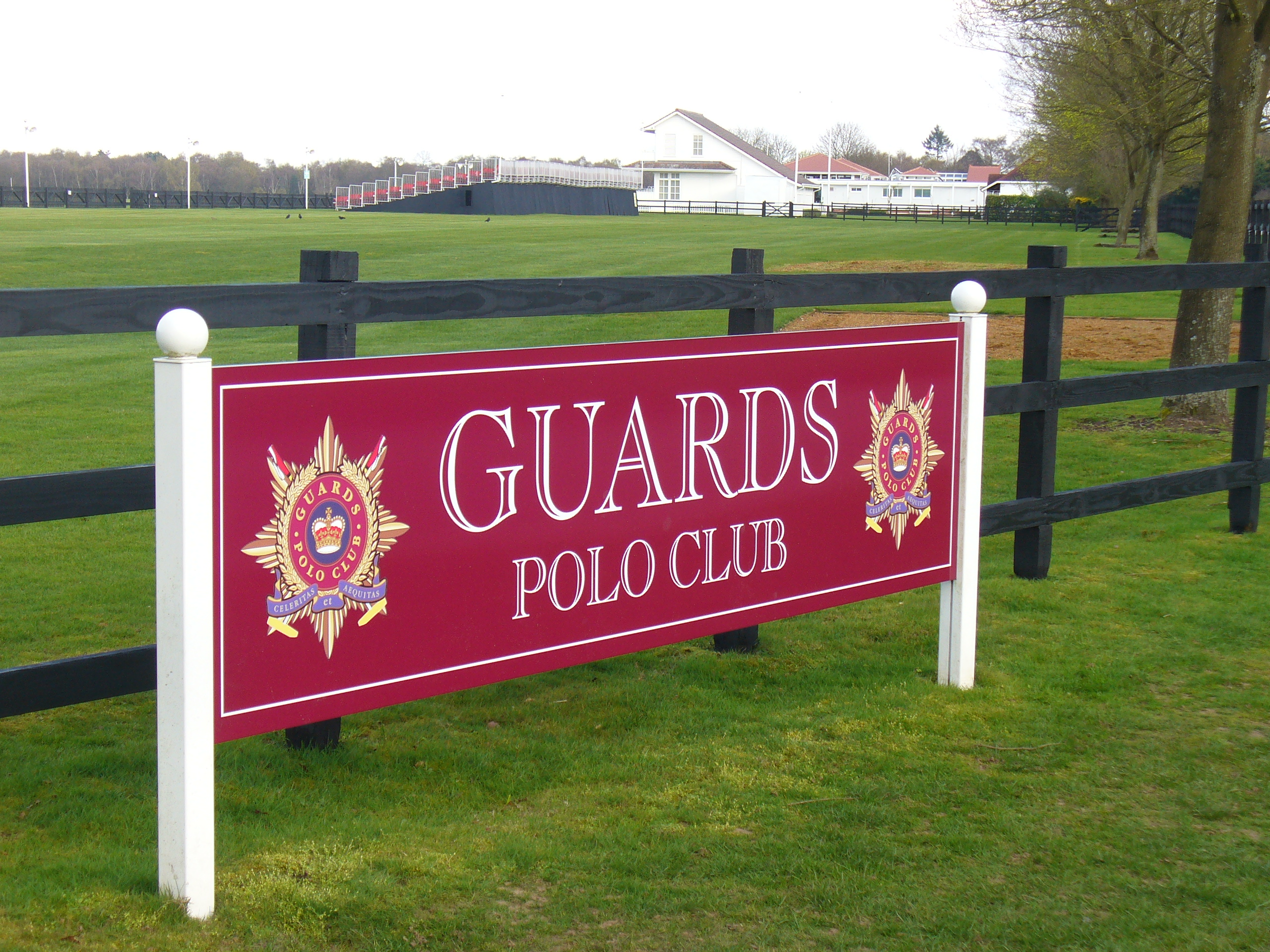

The club name derives from the Guards Division of the British Army. British Army Officers of the Household Division regiments, who hold the Queen/King's Commission, are exempt from the Playing Members' entrance fee, which is £22,000, in addition to the annual subscription of £5,850 (as at 2012). It claims on its website to have the largest membership of any polo club in Europe, and is one of the four polo clubs in the United Kingdom that stage elite high goal tournaments; the others are the Cirencester Park, Cowdray Park and Royal County of Berkshire Polo Club.

The Polo Magazine called it "the most prestigious polo club in the world".

The best-known day on the Guards Polo Club's calendar is the Hurlingham Polo Association's International Day (formerly known for sponsorship reasons as the Cartier International). Always held at the end of July, it has in the past attracted crowds of over 30,000 people.

The Club's playing season starts in April and finishes in mid September. Tournaments are the Queen's Cup (high goal), Royal Windsor (medium goal) and the Archie David (low goal), all of which take place in June. The Club is also home to the Inter-Regimental in July, The Duke of Wellington Trophy in August and the Nations Cup in September, at which the Club's 1st V successfully competes.
