= Orthwein =

Orthwein is a surname. Notable people with the surname include:

- Charles F. Orthwein (1839–1898), German-born American businessman.
- William D. Orthwein (1841–1925), German-born American businessman.
- Frederick C. Orthwein (1871–1927), American businessman.
- William R. Orthwein (1881–1955), American water polo player, attorney.
- Percy Orthwein (1888–1957), American businessman
- William R. Orthwein Jr. (1917–2011), American businessman and philanthropist.
- Adolphus Busch Orthwein (1917–2013), American heir and business executive
- James Orthwein (1924–2008), American heir and businessman
- Stephen A. Orthwein (1945–2018), American heir and polo player.
- Peter Busch Orthwein, American heir, businessman, polo player
- Laura X (born 1940; née Laura Rand Orthwein Jr.), American feminist, human rights activist

== See also ==
- Orthwein Mansion, a historic mansion in St. Louis, Missouri, USA.
