= August Busch IV =

American businessman (born 1964)

August Anheuser Busch IV
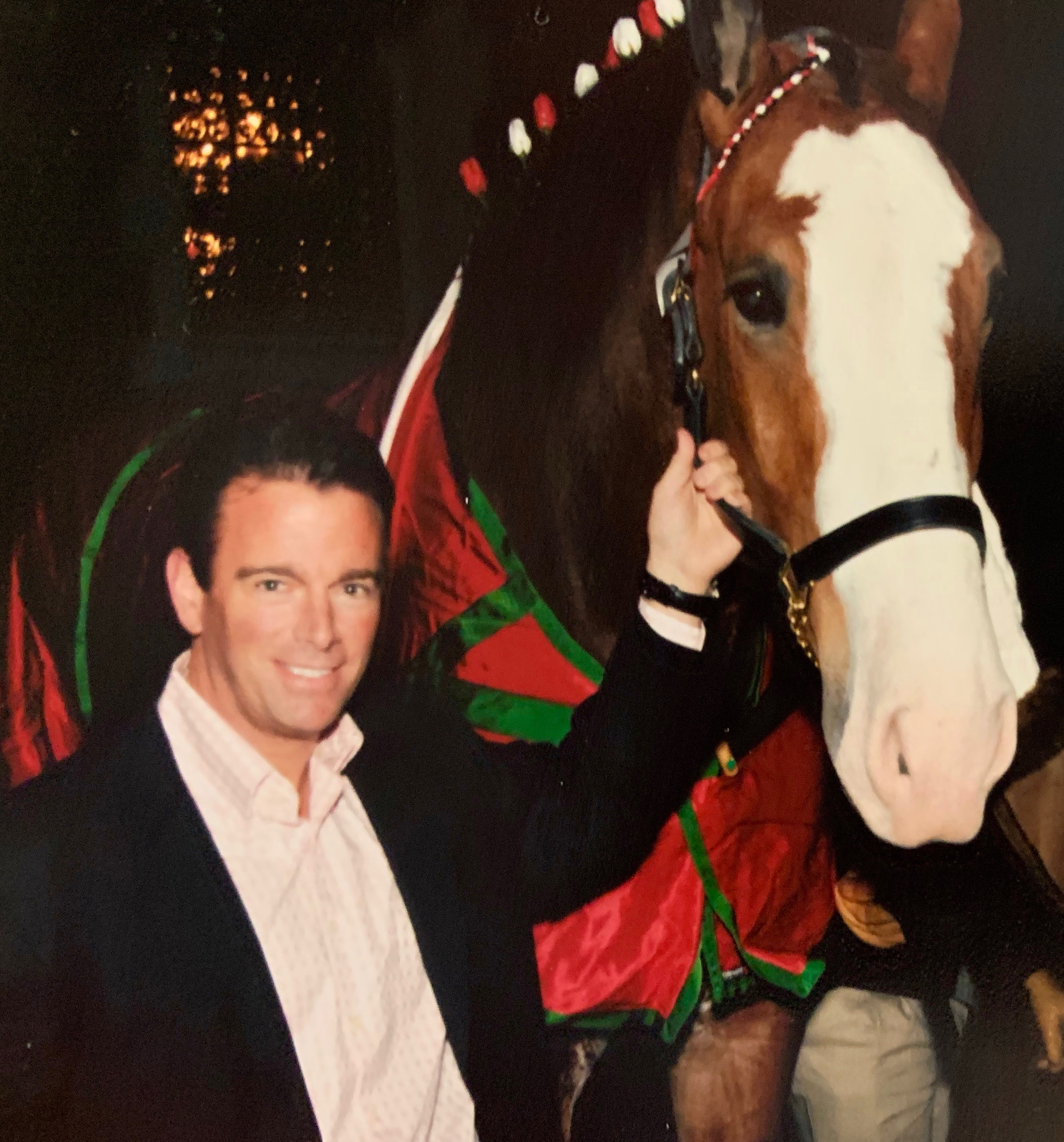
- Busch with a Budweiser Clydesdale in 2006
- Born: August Anheuser Busch IV; June 15, 1964 (age 62); St. Louis, Missouri, U.S.
- Education: Saint Louis University; VLB Berlin
- Occupations: Board member of Anheuser-Busch InBev; Retired president and CEO, Anheuser-Busch Companies, Inc. Retired director, FedEx
- Spouse: Kathryn "Kate" Thatcher (2006–2009) divorced
- Parent(s): August Busch III and Susan (Hornibrook) Busch
- Website: www.augustbusch.com

August Anheuser Busch IV (born June 15, 1964) is an American businessman and former CEO of Anheuser-Busch. He was the last of the Busch family to control the company, which was purchased in a hostile takeover by InBev in 2008. Busch IV was known for his marketing leadership, where his history as head of the Anheuser-Busch marketing department garnered ten straight USA Today Super Bowl Ad Meter awards, as well as awards at the Cannes Film Festival and the Grand Clio. He also served as a director of shipping giant FedEx. Busch has been involved in a number of legal incidents during his lifetime.

== Early life ==
August Anheuser Busch IV is a great-great-grandson of Anheuser-Busch founder Adolphus Busch, and a great-great-great-grandson of Eberhard Anheuser, who originally purchased the brewery in 1860. He is the son of Susan (Hornibrook) and August Anheuser Busch III, the former chairman, president and CEO of the company.

Busch's parents divorced when he was five, and he lived with his mother. His time with his father was mostly spent at the brewery, and their relationship was, for the most part, professional.

=== Education ===
Busch received a bachelor's degree in finance and later a master's degree in business administration from Saint Louis University. He later served on the university's board of trustees.

In his early twenties, Busch earned a brewmaster's degree from Versuchs- und Lehranstalt für Brauerei, a brewing institute in Berlin.

== Anheuser-Busch ==
=== Early years ===
After graduation he followed the family tradition of starting at the bottom of Anheuser-Busch. He worked as a brewing apprentice in the Old Malt House as a union member of Brewers & Maltsters Local 6 in St. Louis, Missouri, as an intern in the culture yeast center, and later as a foreman in packaging and shipping operations.

In 1989, he moved into marketing, working on the Bud Dry brand launch. Although the launch was considered a success, the product ultimately proved to be unsuccessful. Busch's father initially opposed the campaign; he later admitted, "I've lost the ability to understand the 21- to 30-year-olds the way I used to."

In 1994, Busch was named vice president of brand management. In 1996, he became vice president of marketing. Busch was promoted in 2000 to group vice president of marketing and wholesale operations. Under his leadership, the company emphasized more creative and often humorous advertising. In an interview with Fortune magazine, he recounted a conversation with his father August Busch III, then the company's president and CEO, that Budweiser sales would grow only if the iconic brand's identity was reinvented. "There was a culture weaved into the Budweiser brand... No one wanted to change it," Busch IV told the magazine. The new advertising campaigns launched by Busch IV cemented his reputation for marketing instincts. The Budweiser and Bud Light commercials won the USA Today Super Bowl Ad Meter every year from 1999 to 2008.

=== Budweiser frogs, penguins, ants, lizards ===
Busch IV focused the marketing department on humor, youth, animals, and tradition. He insisted to his father that his department could make splashy—yet risky—ads targeted at a younger demographic. That led to the creation of the Budweiser Frogs advertising campaign featuring puppet frogs chirping "Bud", "Weis", and "Er". Other campaigns overseen by Busch IV featured a friendly alligator, a sinister penguin with the catchphrase "doobie doobie do", partying ants, and a self-absorbed lizard named Louie. The ads, according to Fortune, helped Anheuser-Busch stock rise by 27% in 1996. By 1998, the company achieved its best sales year ever.

=== Chairman and InBev takeover ===
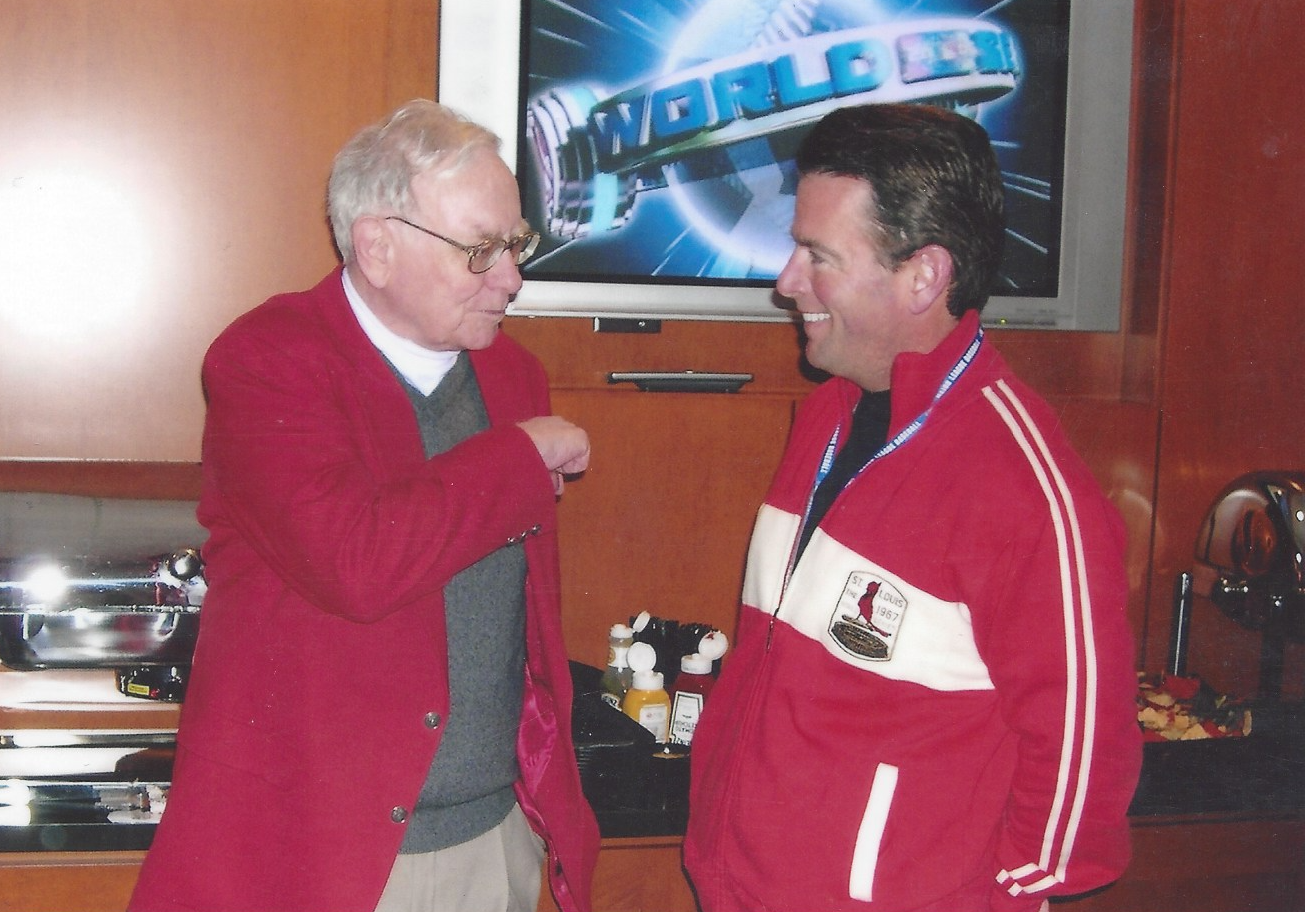
Former Anheuser-Busch CEO August Busch IV (right) with Berkshire Hathaway Chairman Warren Buffett (left), 2006

In 2002, Busch (and other family members) were passed over when the company named Patrick Stokes as its first non-family president and CEO. Busch's father had said that he owns 1% of the stock and that the "board of directors calls the shots" at the company.

In 2004, as president of the company, Busch IV announced the brewer had purchased the 20-year naming rights to a new Busch Stadium, the home of the St. Louis Cardinals. Team owner William Dewitt Jr. said: "From the day we began planning for the new ballpark, we wanted to keep the name 'Busch Stadium'. August Busch IV and Anheuser-Busch share our vision for continuing that tradition for our great fans and the entire St. Louis community." Dewitt, as part of an ownership group, purchased the team from the brewery in 1996.

Busch became president and CEO effective December 2006. Busch's father had been criticized for not expanding globally and leaving the company open for acquisition. In 2007, August and the directors began discussions to acquire Diageo but the deal never advanced.

Less than 18 months into Busch's tenure, rumors circulated that InBev was attempting to buy the company. In April 2008, Busch told beer distributors that Anheuser-Busch would never be bought "on my watch". Anheuser-Busch stock had closed at $49.20 per share on April 30, 2008. InBev offered $65 per share in June, and Busch refused. Prior to InBev's offer, Anheuser-Busch's stock had never been higher than $51.97. In hopes of keeping its independence, Busch proposed acquiring the remaining 50% it did not own of Grupo Modelo. InBev then said it would not include Busch in the new company board, but would include his half-uncle Adolphus Busch IV, who had favored the deal. Eventually InBev sweetened its bid to $70 per share and kept Busch on the board.

On July 13, 2008, Busch signed off on the sale of Anheuser-Busch to InBev, ending 156 years of family control. Press reports indicated that the Busch family's ownership of the company had greatly dwindled over the years, with Busch's father owning just 1.2 percent at the time of the takeover. In total, the Busch family owned about 4 percent of the company and were not the company's biggest shareholders; Barclays owned 6 percent and Berkshire Hathaway owned 5 percent. The family also did not own supervoting stock, as do many publicly traded companies with family affiliations. The board did not employ the common takeover defense tactic of staggering its board of directors' terms (the Anheuser-Busch board was re-elected each year).

According to reports, Busch IV and his father, August Busch III, were estranged. Busch III was said to have engineered the Anheuser-Busch takeover, blindsiding his son. The public conflict between father and son led to the higher price. Anheuser-Busch gave Busch IV a title of non-executive director and a contract as a consultant that ran until December 2013. He was also given a security detail through 2011.

Busch IV earned $100 million in the deal with InBev. He also received a seat on InBev's board for a three-year term, $10.35 million in advance, and the promise of $120,000 a month in consultancy fees, as well as a personal security team. The same month the InBev takeover was completed, Busch resigned as a director of FedEx, a position he had held since 2003.

== Personal life ==
Busch holds advanced black belt degrees in the martial arts disciplines of judo, taekwondo, and hapkido. He studied under Korean Grand Master Bong Yul Shin, who served as Busch's bodyguard. Busch, reported as a lean 5-foot-10-inch man in 2005, was described as having a striking resemblance to his father. Busch IV and his family have a long history in aviation. Busch is trained to fly both helicopters and jets.

Busch married Kathryn "Kate" Thatcher, sixteen years his junior, in August 2006 in Bradford, Vermont, shortly before becoming CEO. He filed for divorce on November 26, 2008, the same month the InBev takeover was completed. The couple had a prenuptial agreement, and the divorce moved quickly through the courts, becoming official at the end of January 2009. The couple had no children.

== Charity ==
Busch IV currently serves or has served on numerous charitable boards, including:

- Backstoppers, current director.
- August Busch IV Foundation, which supports grant funding for Barnes Jewish Hospital study of treatment-resistant depression.
- Former board member of Cardinal Glennon Children's Hospital in St. Louis.
- Former board member of National Urban League.
- Honored by the National Academy of Television Arts and Sciences for contributions to sports television.
- Lifetime achievement award from Larry King Cardiac Foundation.

== Legal troubles ==
=== Accident resulting in death of Michele Frederick (1983) ===
At age 19, while attending the University of Arizona, Busch was involved in an automobile accident that resulted in the death of his passenger, 21-year-old Michele Frederick, a local model and waitress. According to witnesses, Busch had left a bar early one morning with Frederick. The vehicle wrecked at a 25 mph curve known for accidents. The car flipped and Frederick flew through the sunroof and was probably killed instantly when the car rolled over her. Busch left the scene of the accident without informing anyone. When police arrived on the scene hours later, they found several empty Bud Light cans lying near the car, and inside the car a wallet with two driver's licenses registered to Busch, as well as a handgun. Deputies found Busch at his Tucson townhouse 4 miles (6 km) away, with blood on his body, a sawed-off shotgun, and in a dazed condition exhibiting signs of amnesia. Busch was found to have suffered a skull fracture in the accident. After a lengthy investigation by the Pima County Sheriff's Department in July 1984, the Pima County District Attorney announced he was not charging Busch with any wrongdoing. He said that while Busch appeared to have been speeding at 45 mph, that was not sufficient for charges, and witnesses from the bar did not report that he appeared to be drinking excessively. As part of regular procedure, police took blood and urine samples to assess whether and how much he had been drinking at the time of the accident. However, the hospital lost the urine sample, and the blood sample had been run through a centrifuge, rendering it useless.

=== Car chase (1985) ===
Busch was arrested at the age of 20 in St. Louis after leading undercover police in an unmarked car on a chase with speeds reaching between 85 and 90 mph on Kingshighway Boulevard in the Central West End of the city. Two narcotics detectives driving west on U.S. Route 40 started chasing Busch when he allegedly passed them going 80 to 90 miles per hour. Busch stopped twice, but each time sped away when an officer approached his car. He was returning from visiting PT's Sports Cabaret, a strip bar in Sauget, Illinois. The officers ended the chase by shooting out the rear tire of Busch's car. Busch claimed he thought they were attempting to kidnap him. The police accused him of trying to run over two officers with his Mercedes. Busch was acquitted of assault by a St. Louis jury.

=== Death of Adrienne Nicole Martin (2010) ===
On Sunday, December 19, 2010, Adrienne Nicole Martin, a 27-year-old divorcee and part-time waitress who had been dating Busch for about two years, was found dead at Busch's home in Huntleigh, Missouri. Busch was in the house at the time and a household employee called 9-1-1 at 1:15 p.m. Her mother said her daughter was happy with Busch, and Adrienne Martin's obituary would describe Busch as "the love of her life."

The initial autopsy revealed no signs of trauma and was inconclusive as to cause of death. Martin's ex-husband Kevin J. Martin, a Cape Girardeau, Missouri osteopathic physician, said Martin suffered from long QT syndrome, a heart condition that could cause an unexpected sudden death, but he had not discussed this with authorities. Martin's mother said that Martin was taking trazodone for sleep issues. Kevin Martin noted such use needs to be monitored by a physician.

The matter was investigated by Frontenac, Missouri police, who ordered toxicology tests. A toxicology report in February 2011 indicated Martin had cocaine and oxycodone in her system; pill bottles with her name were found containing each of these. She had no prescription for either. The St. Louis County Prosecutor confirmed that Martin had lethal levels of both oxycodone and cocaine in her system, and ruled she died of an accidental overdose. The report noted that Martin's physical condition showed she had been using cocaine for several months to a year.

On March 31, 2011, Adrienne's ex-husband Kevin Martin filed a wrongful death suit against Busch for negligence and on behalf of their son Blake Alexander Martin (born 2002). The case was to be handled in Cape Girardeau. Adrienne's mother announced she was hiring New York attorney John Q. Kelly (who previously represented Beth Holloway and the estate of Nicole Brown Simpson) to pursue the case, and also said she would seek custody of her grandson. She was concerned that a friendship between Adrienne's ex-husband and Busch would taint the civil case. On April 6, 2011, Adrienne's father George "Larry" Eby joined the suit, saying he had been deprived of the "companionship, comfort, instruction, guidance, counsel and training of Adrienne Martin." Friends of the family noted Eby and Martin had been estranged during her adult years.

On April 20, 2011, the press reported that Busch had agreed to a $1.5 million settlement with Kevin Martin on behalf of his son. The court would decide how much could be allocated to Adrienne's parents.

=== Helicopter incident ===
On July 10, 2017, Busch was arrested in Swansea, Illinois after he allegedly tried to fly a helicopter containing 4 guns and 8 dogs while intoxicated. According to Swansea police, officers were called around 8:15 PM when Busch IV appeared to be trying to take off in his helicopter. He was administered a breathalyzer twice and both times blew a 0.000. He was taken to a local hospital for blood and urine samples. Officers believed he may have been under the influence of prescription drugs. Blood tests later came back clean, according to the St. Clair County State's Attorney.
