= William Orthwein =

William Orthwein may refer to:

- William R. Orthwein (1881–1955), American sportsman, attorney, business executive and political activist
- William R. Orthwein Jr. (1917–2011), American businessman and philanthropist
- William D. Orthwein (1841–1925), German-born American Civil War veteran and grain merchant

== See also ==
- Bill Ortwein (1940–2019), member of the Tennessee Senate
