= Adolphus Busch Orthwein =

American heir and business executive

- Born: September 2, 1917; St. Louis, Missouri, U.S.
- Died: November 25, 2013 (aged 96); Huntleigh, Missouri, U.S.
- Resting place: Sunset Memorial Park and Mausoleum
- Education: Yale University
- Occupation: Businessman
- Known for: Executive at Anheuser-Busch and Starbeam Supply Company
- Spouses: Ann Thornley; Nancy Morrison
- Children: 5 sons, including Stephen A. Orthwein and Peter Busch Orthwein
- Relatives: Adolphus Busch (maternal great-grandfather)

Adolphus Busch Orthwein, also known as Dolph Orthwein, (September 2, 1917 – November 25, 2013) was an American heir and business executive.

== Biography ==
Adolphus Busch Orthwein was born on September 2, 1917, in St. Louis, Missouri. His father was Percy Orthwein and his mother, Clara Busch. His maternal great-grandfather, Adolphus Busch, was the founder of Anheuser-Busch. He grew up at Grant's Farm in Grantwood Village, Missouri and summered at Red River Farm in Cooperstown, New York.

Orthwein was kidnapped by Charles Abernathy, an unemployed real estate superintendent, "a lone negro with a revolver" according to the New York Times, on New Year's Eve in 1930, when he was thirteen years old. His abductor's father, Pearl Abernathy, returned Orthwein to his family on New Year's Day.

Orthwein graduated from Yale University in 1940. During World War II, he served as an intelligence officer in the United States Navy, tracking German submarines in the Caribbean Sea. He served in the United States Naval Reserve in St. Louis and retired as Lieutenant Commander.

Orthwein joined the family business, Anheuser-Busch. He served as vice president of operations until the late 1950s. Additionally, he served on its board of directors until 1963. He considered running the company as a birthright.

In the 1960s, Orthwein acquired Starbeam Supply Co., later known as Starbeam Supply Company. The company, headquartered in Olivette, Missouri, sells lighting for large industrial spaces.

Orthwein died of lymphoma on November 25, 2013, in Huntleigh, Missouri. He was ninety-six years old. His funeral was held at St. Peter's Episcopal Church in Ladue, Missouri. Another ceremony was held in Palm Beach, Florida. He was buried at Bellefontaine Cemetery.

== Polo and hunting ==
Orthwein was a three-goal polo player. He played polo until he was eighty-one. He was inducted into the Missouri Horseman's Hall of Fame.

Orthwein was the Master of the Hounds of the Bridlespur Hunt, a fox hunting club in Huntleigh, Missouri. He was also a duck hunter.

== Personal life ==
Orthwein was married twice. His first wife, whom he married in 1941, was Ann "Nancy" Thornley. They had four sons together (Adolphus Busch Orthwein Jr., Stephen A. Orthwein, Peter Busch Orthwein, and David Thornley Orthwein) before they divorced. She subsequently married David Metcalfe.

Orthwein was married to his second wife, tennis player Nancy Morrison, for fifty-one years. They had one son, Christopher DaCamara Orthwein. They resided in Huntleigh, Missouri and summered at their family estate in Cooperstown, New York.

Orthwein was a member of the St. Louis Country Club and the Log Cabin Club, two private members' clubs in St. Louis, Missouri. He was also a member of the Bath and Tennis Club in Palm Beach, Florida and the Cooperstown Country Club in Cooperstown, New York. He was a former member of the Everglades Club. He enjoyed playing tennis, chess and poker. He carried a pistol for safety.

== See also ==
- List of kidnappings
- List of solved missing person cases
