= James Orthwein =

American business executive

- Born: James Busch Orthwein; March 13, 1924; St. Louis, Missouri, U.S.
- Died: August 15, 2008 (aged 84); Huntleigh, Missouri, U.S.
- Education: Choate School
- Alma mater: Washington University in St. Louis
- Occupation: Businessman
- Parent(s): Percy Orthwein; Clara Busch
- Relatives: Adolphus Busch (maternal great-grandfather)

James Busch Orthwein (March 13, 1924 – August 15, 2008) was an American heir and business executive. He owned the New England Patriots of the National Football League (NFL) from 1992 to 1993. After unsuccessfully attempting to move the franchise to his home city of St. Louis, he sold the Patriots to Robert Kraft in 1994.

== Early life ==
James Busch Orthwein was born on March 13, 1924. His father, Percy Orthwein, was an advertising executive. His mother, Clara Busch, was the granddaughter of Adolphus Busch, the German-born founder of Anheuser-Busch.

Orthwein was educated at the Choate School in Wallingford, Connecticut. He graduated from Washington University in St. Louis.

== Career ==
Orthwein joined his father's advertising firm in 1947. He served as the chairman and chief executive of the D'Arcy Advertising Company from 1970 to 1983. Orthwein took the advertising agency to the global stage, merging with agencies in Detroit and London. In 1985, the St. Louis-based company merged with Benton & Bowles of New York to form D'Arcy Masius Benton & Bowles.

Orthwein served on the board of directors of Anheuser-Busch from 1963 to 2001. In 1997, Orthwein held 1.6 million shares in Anheuser-Busch, more than any other company insider with the exception of his first cousin, chairman and president August Busch III.

Orthwein was a co-founder of Huntleigh Asset Partners, a private investment firm, in 1983. It was later renamed Precise Capital.

Orthwein purchased the New England Patriots from Victor Kiam in 1992, when Kiam was facing bankruptcy and owed him millions. The purchase price was $106 million. During his ownership, Orthwein hired Bill Parcells as head coach and oversaw the drafting of first-overall draft pick quarterback Drew Bledsoe, who helped to return the moribund franchise to respectability. He planned to move the Patriots franchise to St. Louis, renaming the team the St. Louis Stallions. However, those plans were derailed when Boston paper magnate Robert Kraft, owner of Foxboro Stadium, refused to accept a buyout of the lease. Orthwein no longer wanted to run the team in New England and put it up for sale. However, the terms of the Patriots' operating covenant with the stadium required any new owner to negotiate with Kraft. Knowing this, Kraft staged what amounted to a hostile takeover, offering to buy the team outright for $175 million. Although future St. Louis/Los Angeles Rams owner Stan Kroenke offered to buy the team for $200 million and move it to St. Louis, Orthwein would have been saddled with all relocation expenses. More importantly, he would have had to bear any legal expenses that arose from the sale. Almost as soon as Orthwein put the Patriots on the market, Kraft made it clear that he would go to court to enforce the lease. Facing an untenable situation, Orthwein accepted Kraft's bid on January 21, 1994.

== Personal life and death ==
One of Orthwein's wives was Romaine Dahlgren Pierce, who had married and divorced William Simpson and David Mountbatten, 3rd Marquess of Milford Haven. Orthwein's third wife was Ruth Orthwein; they divorced in the late 1990s. Orthwein died of cancer at his home in Huntleigh, Missouri, in 2008.

For 35 years, Orthwein was Master of Foxhounds at Bridlespur Hunt Club; he was a member of the Missouri Horseman's Hall of Fame. He helped raise more than $1 million for charities related to horse shows.

Preceded by Victor Kiam	New England Patriots Principal Owner; 1992–1994	Succeeded by Robert Kraft
