= Peter Busch =

Peter Busch may refer to:

- Peter M. Busch (1934–1986), U. S. Marine Corps officer
- Peter Busch Orthwein (born 1945), American heir, businessman, and polo player
