= VLB =

VLB may refer to:

== Science and technology ==
- VESA Local Bus, a local bus based on the Intel 80486 CPU
- Very large board, a large printed circuit board
- Vincaleukoblastine, or vinblastine, an antitumor alkaloid

== Other uses ==
- VLB Berlin (Versuch- u. Lehranstalt für Brauerei in Berlin), a brewing school and trade organization in Berlin
- Volunteer Life Brigade, the forerunners of today Auxiliary Coastguard in the United Kingdom
