= Manufacturers Railway =

Manufacturers Railway may refer to:

- Manufacturers Railway (St. Louis)
- Manufacturers Railway (Toledo, Ohio), later part of Pennsylvania, Ohio and Detroit Railroad
