= Frederick Widmann =

- Born: 1859; Germany
- Died: 1925 (aged 65–66)
- Education: Washington University in St. Louis
- Occupations: Architect, philanthropist

Frederick Widmann (1859-1925) was a German-born American architect and philanthropist.

== Early life ==
Frederick Widmann was born in 1859 in Germany. He emigrated to the United States in 1874, settling in St. Louis, Missouri. Widmann was an apprentice carpenter to Walsh and Jungenfeld for three years and he studied at Washington University in St. Louis.

== Career ==
Widmann co-founded Widmann & Walsh, an architectural firm with Robert W. Walsh. Around 1900, alongside architect Caspar D. Boisselier they designed the Orthwein Mansion for William D. Orthwein, which is listed on the National Register of Historic Places.

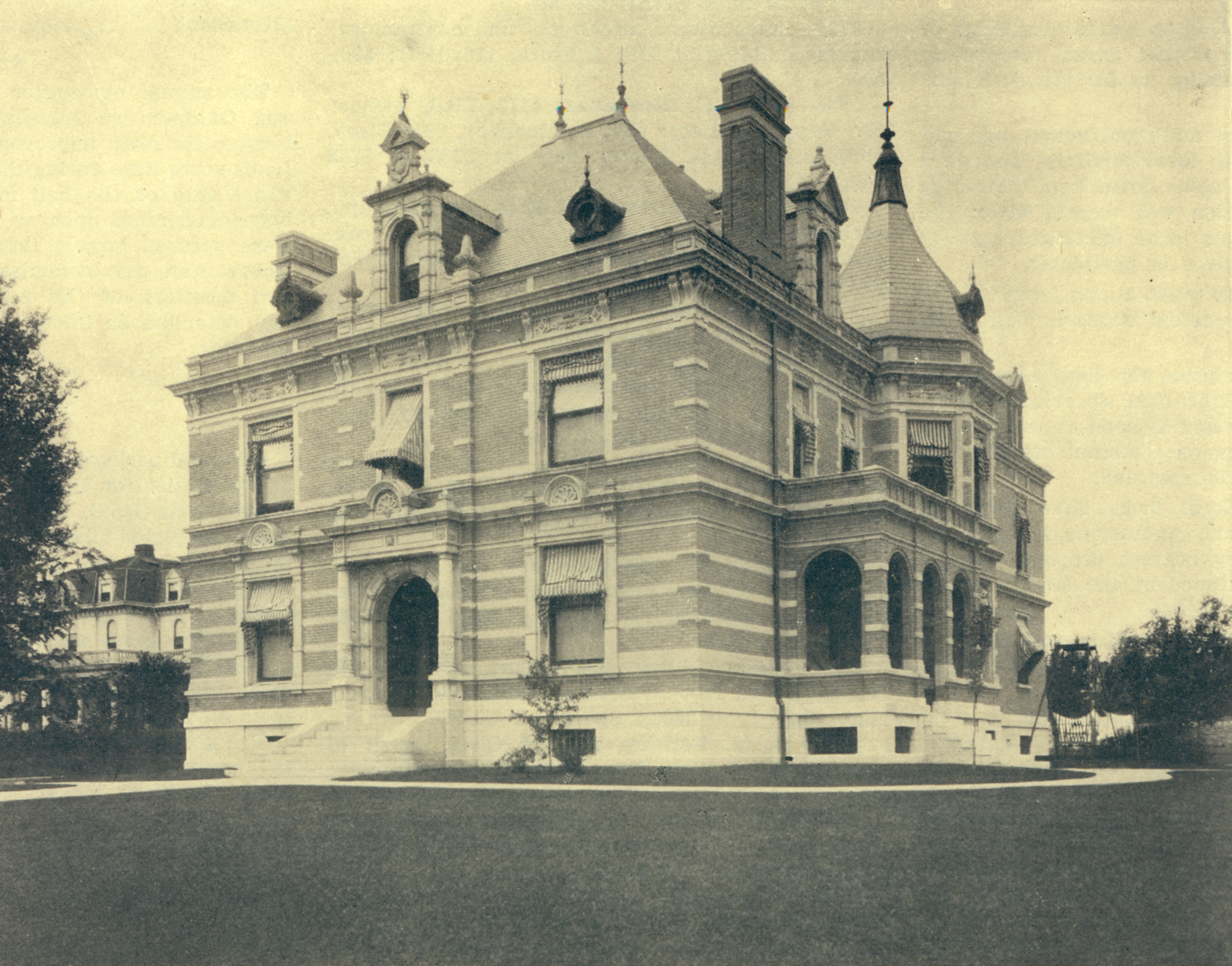
Brinckwirth Residence, St. Louis, circa 1904

Meanwhile, Widmann designed "many large industrial plants, public buildings, and some of the largest breweries in the country, including the Anheuser-Busch plants in St. Louis, Omaha, San Antonio, Houston, Chicago, and New York." In 1903, he designed "The Pike" for the St. Louis World's Fair 1904.

Widmann designed his private residence at 3545 Longfellow Boulevard in Compton Heights, a German enclave of St. Louis, Missouri. It was designed in the Prairie School architectural style, with a side cupola.

Beyond architecture, Widmann was also an explorer of asphalt and oilfields in Utah from 1883 to 1923.

== Philanthropy ==
Widmann was a member of the Liederkranz Club, a German-American social club in St. Louis. During World War I, he served as the President of the St. Louis War Relief Bazaar. The organization raised US$100,000 for German orphans and widows. To honor his effort, Widmann was the recipient of the second degree of the Austro-Hungarian Red Cross from Emperor Franz Joseph I of Austria in 1916.

== Death and legacy ==
Widmann died in 1925. In his will, Widmann endowed the Frederick Widmann Prize in Architecture at the Sam Fox School of Design & Visual Arts of his alma mater, Washington University in St. Louis. The prize gives US$1,500 to an architecture student annually. Furthermore, Widmann Canyon in Utah was named in his honor.
