= Lindschied =

- Stadtteil of Bad Schwalbach
- Coat of arms
- Interactive map of Lindschied
- Location within Germany Location within Hesse
- Coordinates: 50°08′N 08°04′E
- Country: Germany
- State: Hesse
- Admin. region: Darmstadt
- District: Rheingau-Taunus-Kreis
- Town: Bad Schwalbach
- Elevation: 400 m (1,300 ft)

Population (2008)
  - Total: 600
- Time zone: UTC+01:00 (CET)
  - Summer (DST): UTC+02:00 (CEST)
- Postal codes: 65307
- Dialling codes: 06124
- Website: www.lindschied.com

Lindschied is a village in Hesse, Germany. It is part of Bad Schwalbach, lies in the hills of the Taunus and has about 600 inhabitants.

In the time of the Roman Empire, the border-wall called limes went through Lindschied's boundaries. Today, many remnants can be found, such as parts of this old wall itself and remains of Roman watchtowers.

In Lindschied, the co-founder of the Anheuser-Busch brewery, Adolphus Busch, built his mansion "Villa Lilly", which is named after his wife Elisabeth Anheuser. In 1913, Adolphus Busch died in this mansion.
