= Frederick C. Orthwein =

American Businessman

- Born: Frederick Charles Orthwein; May 11, 1871; St. Louis, Missouri, U.S.
- Died: September 23, 1927 (aged 56); St. Louis, Missouri, U.S.
- Resting place: Bellefontaine Cemetery
- Occupation: Businessman
- Spouse: Jeannette F. Niedringhaus
- Children: 3 sons, 1 daughter
- Parent(s): William D. Orthwein; Emily H. Thuemmler
- Relatives: Percy Orthwein (brother); William R. Orthwein (brother); William R. Orthwein Jr. (nephew)

Frederick C. Orthwein (May 12, 1871 - September 23, 1927) was an American businessman from St. Louis, Missouri.

== Early life ==
Orthwein was born on May 11, 1871, in St. Louis, where his father, William D. Orthwein, was a German-born grain merchant.

== Career ==
Orthwein was the owner and president of the William D. Orthwein Grain Company, founded by his father. In 1900, he co-founded the Gulf Ports Grain Exporters' Association, a trade organization whose aim was to set common rules of grain exports among merchants in St. Louis, Chicago and Kansas City, Missouri. Orthwein served as its secretary and treasurer.

Orthwein also served as the president of the William F. Niedringhaus Investment Company, his father-in-law's investment firm. Like his father, he served on the boards of directors of the Mississippi Valley Trust Company and the Kinloch Telephone Company. He also served on the boards of the St. Louis Coke & Chemical Company, the Gilbsonite Construction Company, and Anheuser-Busch. From 1913 to 1915, Orthwein served on the board of the National Bank of Commerce of St. Louis.

== Personal life ==
In 1896, Orthwein married Jeannette F. Niedringhaus, the daughter of William F. Niedringhaus and niece of Frederick G. Niedringhaus. They had three sons—William D. Orthwein II, Frederick C. Orthwein Jr., and Richard Walter Orthwein—and one daughter, Janet. They were members of the Methodist Episcopal Church.

Orthwein was a member of the St. Louis Club, the Racquet Club of St. Louis, the Sunset Hill Country Club, and the Bellerive Country Club. He was an avid golf player.

== Death ==
Orthwein died in 1927. He was buried at the Bellefontaine Cemetery in St. Louis.
