= St. Louis Mining and Stock Exchange =

- Type: Regional stock exchange
- Location: St. Louis, Missouri, United States
- Coordinates: Third Street between Olive and Locust
- Founded: December 2, 1880
- Closed: 1893
- Currency: USD

The St. Louis Mining and Stock Exchange was an American regional stock exchange. It formed in St. Louis, Missouri on December 2, 1880. It closed in 1893 during a financial depression.

== History ==
The St. Louis Mining Exchange was formed in 1874. Location was described as the southeast corner of Fourth and Elm Streets. Founded by M. S. Mepham & Co as a headquarters for those engaged in mining or selling mineral lands.

The St. Louis Mining and Stock Exchange was formed in St. Louis in the fall of 1880, on Third Street between Olive and Locust Street. The first meeting was held at its rooms at that location on December 2, 1880. on which day the exchange also opened for business at 11 am.

Founding officers and directors included James Baker, Thomas Richeson, G. W. Chadbourne, Charles F. Orthwein, J. W. Paramore, John W. Noble, David R. Francis, and W. R. Allen. Between 1885 and 1890, there was a high level of investment in mining shares, and mining business did well in St. Louis. It was organized under the laws of Missouri with all stock owned by men of St. Louis. With James Baker as president, the 1882 board included Chadbourne, Noble, Allen, Orthwein, Baker, Richeson, Paramore, and others such as D. P. Roland, D. R. Francis, Frank T. Iglehart, E. S. Chester, Jon E. Ennis, and T. W. Herman. It closed in the depression of 1893.

== See also ==
- St. Louis Stock Exchange
- List of former stock exchanges in the Americas
- List of stock exchange mergers in the Americas
- List of stock exchanges
