= Greenwich Polo Club =

Polo and events venue in Connecticut, USA

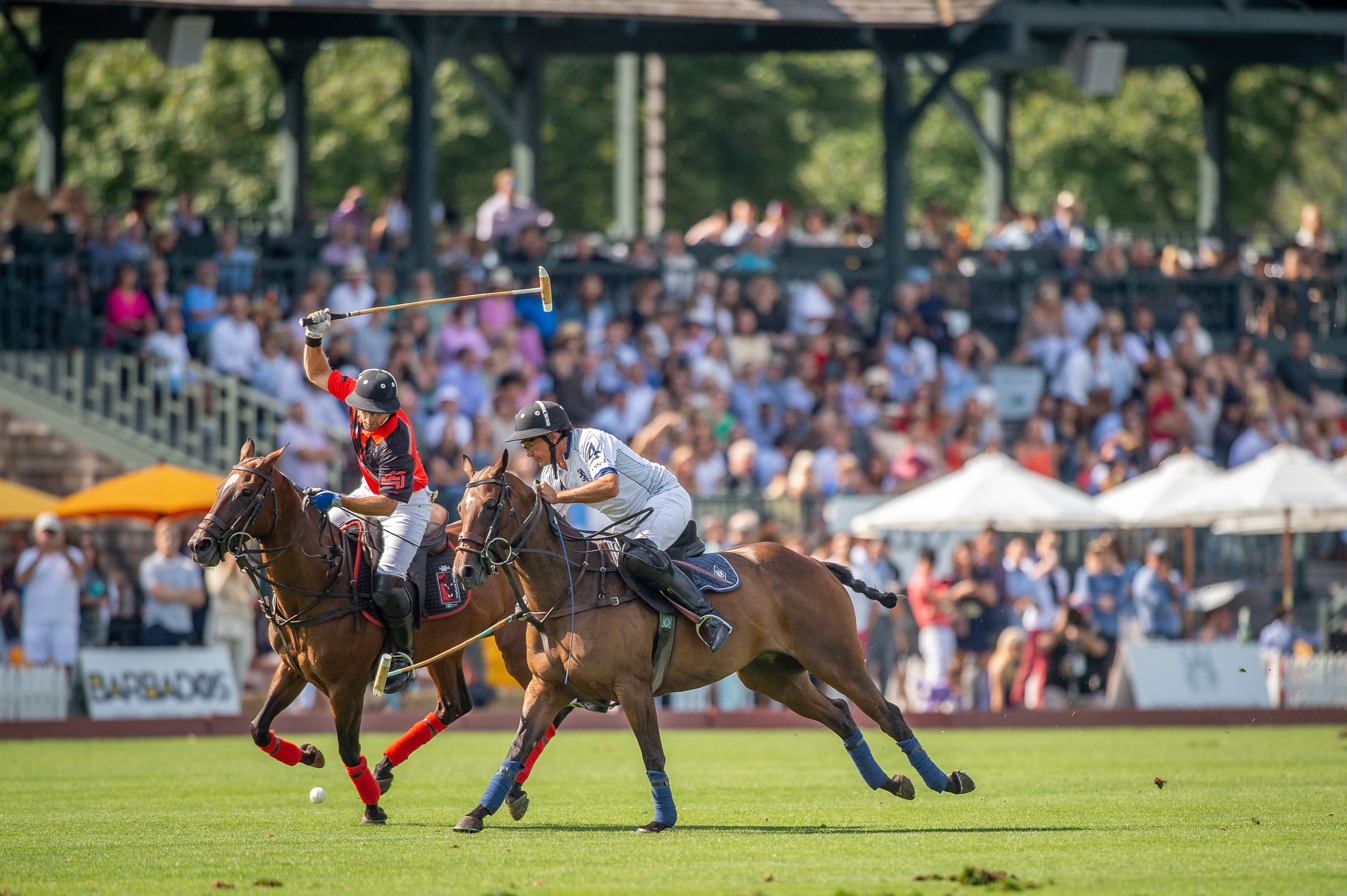
- Greenwich Polo Club during the 2019 East Coast Open tournament
- Interactive map of Greenwich Polo Club
- Full name: Greenwich Polo Club
- Address: 1 Hurlingham Drive
- Location: Greenwich, Connecticut
- Coordinates: 41.1325°N 73.6385°W

Construction
- Opened: 1981

Website
- www.greenwichpoloclub.com

Greenwich Polo Club is a polo club and event venue in Greenwich, Connecticut that was established in 1981. It is one of only three polo venues in the United States offering high-goal polo (20 goals or above). The club hosts high goal polo matches throughout the summer, tournaments typically beginning in June and concluding in September.

Greenwich Polo Club hosts high-goal matches, open to the public, on Sundays throughout the summer, the gates open at 1:00 p.m., and the matches begin at 3:00 p.m.

== Location ==
Greenwich Polo Club is located on North Street in the neighborhood of Conyers Farm in Greenwich, Connecticut. It is surrounded by the Babcock Preserve, Rockwood Lake, the Mianus Reserve State Park Scenic Reserve to the South, and Converse Lake and the Mianus Reservoir to the North.

== Players and Teams ==
Greenwich Polo Club hosts players and teams who are rated amongst the best in the world.

Players past and present have included:

- Peter M. Brant
- Chris Brant
- Nic Roldan (8) (highest-rated American player)
- Michel Dorignac
- Kris Kampsen
- Steve Lefkowitz
- Naco Taverna
- Tommy Biddle
- Mariano Aguerre (10)
- Peter Busch Orthwein
- Fred Mannix Jr.
- Guille Aguero
- Joaquin Panelo (6)
- Tomas Garcia del Rio (8)

2019 East Coast Open Teams:

Audi White Birch Polo Team (Chris Brant, Joaquin Panelo, Matias Magrini and Toro Ruiz)

Monterosso (Alessandro Bazzoni, Ignacio Toccalino, Naco Taverna, Santino Magrini)

Postage Stamp Farm (Annabelle Gundlach, Brandon Phillips, Lerin Zubiaurre, Tomas Garcia Del Rio)

Los Violines (Christophe Landon, Michel Dorignac, Tommy Biddle, Pedrinho Zacharias)

Monterosso Vikings (Siri Bazzoni, Peke Gonzalez, Barto Castongola, Ignacio du Plessis)

== History ==
=== Beginnings ===
It was established in 1981 by Peter M. Brant, who started the White Birch Polo Team. In the 1970s, Brant first met polo legend Thomas B. “Tommy” Glynn at the Fairfield Hunt Club. Under Glynn’s tutelage, Brant grew to love the sport of polo and formed the polo team White Birch in 1979. Brant lived in Greenwich and wanted a place to play in the area. In 1981 Greenwich Polo Club was officially established by Brant with eight founding members including Peter Busch Orthwein, Mickey Tarnapol, Adam Linderman, Marty Gross, Charles Johnson, Henryk de Kwiatkoski, Geofrey Kent and Michael Shore. Glynn was manager of Greenwich Polo Club from 1981 until his death in 2001. Since 1981, Greenwich Polo Club expanded from one to three fields. In 2015, Brant honored Peter Busch Orthwein, co-founder of Thor Industries and the Patron of the Airstream polo team, by naming one of the polo fields at the Greenwich Polo Club in his honor.

=== White Birch Polo Team ===
White Birch captured its first US Open Polo Championship in 2005. It was the team's 31st title at the 26-goal level or higher. White Birch won all three 26 goal tournaments during the 2005 season in Palm Beach. In the 1990s White Birch dominated every major tournament at Palm Beach Polo Club in Florida. The White Birch Polo Team has won more high-level polo tournaments than any other single team in the past 25 years. In 2016, White Birch is playing the high-goal polo seasons at International Polo Club and at its home base at Greenwich Polo Club.

== Tournaments ==
The trophy was a George III silver cup made by silversmiths John Wakelin and William Taylor in London in 1784. The Argentine team (Benjamin Araya, Alfonso Pieres, Gonzalo Pieres and Ernesto Trotz) won 11-10 against the American team (Tommy Wayman, Carlos Gracida, Memito Gracida, and Owen Rinehart). The following year, in 1988, Argentina won again 11-8, with Mike Azzaro replacing Tommy Wayman on the American team. In 1989, Argentina won again, 11-8; while the Argentine team remained the same, the American team was composed of Mike Azzaro, Tommy Wayman, Owen Rinehart, and Dale Smicklas. The championship only last three years, and it was never played again.

=== Tommy Glynn Cup ===
It was home to the Tommy Glynn Cup, first started at the Fairfield County Hunt Club in Westport, Connecticut, in 1975.

=== U.S.P.A. Gold Cup ===
It hosted the U.S.P.A. Gold Cup from 2002 to 2005. The White Birch Polo Team won the trophy those three years.

=== Sentebale Royal Salute Polo Cup ===
On May 15, 2013, Greenwich Polo Club hosted the Sentebale Royal Salute Polo Cup, a charity match that raised US$1 million for Sentebale. Prince Harry co-founded the charity Sentebale with Prince Seeiso of Lesotho to benefit the impoverished children of his small African country. The Sentebale Land Rover team was captained by Royal Salute Ambassador Malcolm Borwick with team members Marc Ganzi, Michael Carrazza, and Prince Harry, one of the founding Patrons of Sentebale. The St. Regis polo team was captained by Sentebale's Ambassador Nacho Figueras with team members Peter Orthwein, Steve Lefkowitz, and Dawn Jones.

=== Shreve, Crump & Low Cup ===
The Shreve, Crump & Low Cup was a huge success in its inaugural year at Greenwich Polo Club. The season-opening tournament proved to be an exciting one with a strong performance from the new team, Huntsman, who are the very first champions of the tournament. Team sponsor Dillon Bacon and his young team played well in the final, scoring 15 goals en route to the Cup. The first-ever MVP went to Toro Ruiz, who showed poise and determination with multiple high-scoring performances. Last season Toro was the leading scorer at GPC for the season, as it looks like this trend will continue yet again in 2018. The 2019 Shreve, Crump & Low Cup was another success, with the young team The Island House taking the trophy in a 6 team battle.

=== USPA Monty Waterbury ===
The Monty Waterbury Cup is the third oldest official USPA trophy in active competition, named in honor of 10-goal polo immortal James "Monty" Waterbury. A member of The Wanderers polo team, which won polo's first U.S. Open Polo Championship® in 1904, he is also remembered as a member of the USA team known as the “Big Four,” which won five Westchester Cups against Great Britain. In 1922, two years after his passing, his friends and teammates played for the first Monty Waterbury Cup, at the Meadow Brook Club, in Westbury, Long Island, where it became a perpetual challenge trophy for an impressive 28-year stretch. Historically played for on handicap by teams entered in the Open, the final game for the U.S. Open Polo Championship® was also the semifinal game for the Monty Waterbury. The inaugural games in 1922 boasted crowds of up to 20,000 people, who witnessed monumental eight chukker long battles. In 1954, however, the U.S. Open changed venues to Illinois, and the tournament was integrated into the Northeastern Circuit schedule, where it slowly receded into the background until its resurgence in 1975. According to Horace Laffaye in his book “Polo in the United States,” the 1975 revival was spearheaded by Circuit Governor George Haas, Jr., whose Fairfield County Hunt Club won the tournament that year. Previously hosted in 2003, 2015 and 2016, this year will be the fourth time the tournament has been hosted at Greenwich Polo Club in Greenwich, Connecticut. Greenwich-based White Birch is tied for the most Waterbury wins with Maryland-based team Gone Away Farm, who dominated in the 1980s and early 1990s, capturing a record five wins.

=== American Cup ===
While polo is recently associated with Argentinean culture, the American Cup celebrates the monumental contributions and advancements of the sport made by those in the United States. The Northeast of the United

The first-ever American Cup at Greenwich Polo Club in 2019 is considered by many to have been highly engaging for both players and spectators. After cruising through a four-team penalty shoot-out, Postage Stamp Farm and Reelay made their ways to the final match. Reelay came out of the gates strong with an early 4–0 lead as a result of first-chukker goals by Will Tomita and Mariano Gonzalez, but nothing broke Postage Stamp Farm's determination. After rallying in the second half to level the game at 8-8 going into the final minute, it all came down to the last toss in at center field. With the score tied, Postage Stamp Farm's Tomas Garcia Del Rio made a steal and breakaway to score the winning goal. This 9-8 victory by Postage Stamp Farm etches the first-ever name onto the American Cup, and several look forward to many more. The MVP title went to Martin Gandara, while Best Playing Pony was Ciudadana, played by Tomas Garcia del Rio.

=== East Coast Open ===
From August 23 to September 6, 2015, Greenwich Polo Club hosted the USPA-sanctioned East Coast Open. Six teams competed in the 20-goal tournament. Audi Polo’s Marc Ganzi, Miguel Novillo Astrada, Nic Roldan, and Juancito Bollini defeated White Birch, consisting of Santino Magrini, Hilario Ulloa, Mariano Aguerre, and Peter Brant, by 14–13 in overtime to win the USPA East Coast Open championship. The East Coast Open at Greenwich Polo Club was live-streamed on Chukker TV, and the final match of the East Coast Open was broadcast on NBC Sports Network on September 13, 2015. The East Coast Open was founded in Rhode Island in 1905 and was played until World War I. It had a renaissance starting in 1978 when Donald Little, then President of the USPA and Captain of the Myopia Polo Club, resurrected the tournament and brought it to Myopia Polo Club in South Hamilton, Massachusetts, where it was played until the early 2000s. Since 1905, the Perry Cup trophy has symbolized this high-goal championship, and winners' names are memorialized on the trophy. Eight teams played the 2016 East Coast Open at Greenwich Polo Club from August 28 to September 11, 2016. In the 2016 final, White Birch defeated Audi in sudden death over time with a goal by Santino Magrini.

September 8, 2019: The 2019 season at Greenwich Polo Club capped off with a East Coast Open victory by Postage Stamp Farm (Annabelle Gundlach, Brandon Phillips, Lerin Zubiaurre and Tomas Garcia del Rio), adding their name for the first time to the historical Perry Trophy. In the final, Postage Stamp Farm defeated Monterosso by a score of 12–10 in front of a record Sunday crowd, with completely packed East and West lawns.
