= Converse Lake =

Lake in Connecticut and New York, US

- Location within Connecticut
- Location: Connecticut and New York
- Coordinates: 41.132645°N 73.652081°W
- Type: lake
- Surface area: 100 acres (40 ha)

Converse Lake is a 100 acres (40 ha) lake located on the border of Connecticut and New York in the United States. It is located in Conyers Farm, a gated community in Greenwich, Connecticut, not far from the Greenwich Polo Club.
