= Marion Foster Washburne =

American author (1863–1944)

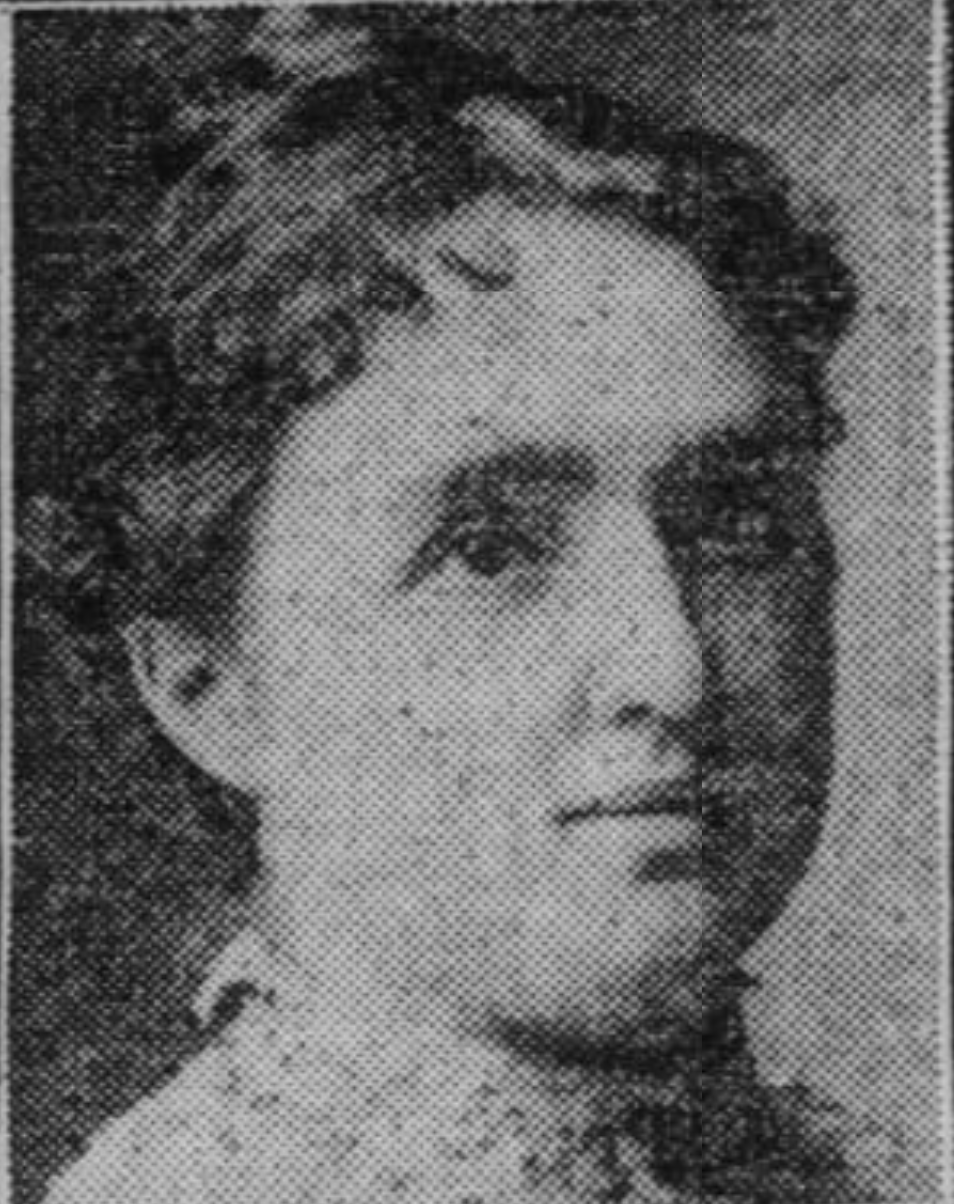
- Washburne in 1902
- Born: Marion Guyon Foster; Northampton, Massachusetts, U.S. August 31, 1863
- Died: 1944
- Education: Chicago Froebel Association Training School
- Occupations: author; journalist; editor; lecturer; educator
- Employers: Hull House; Harper's Bazar; Mothers' Magazine; Little Farms Magazine; Chicago Times-Herald (now Chicago Times; Chicago Tribune; Sunday Times-Herald
- Movement: Back-to-the-land movement; Christian theosophical movement
- Criminal charges: indictment but never tried under the Espionage Act
- Spouses: George Foote Washburne (m. 1886, divorced); William A. Wotherspoon (m. 1915; died 1933)
- Children: 4, including Carleton Washburne
- Relatives: John Willock Noble (uncle); Herman Stegeman (son-in-law)

Signature
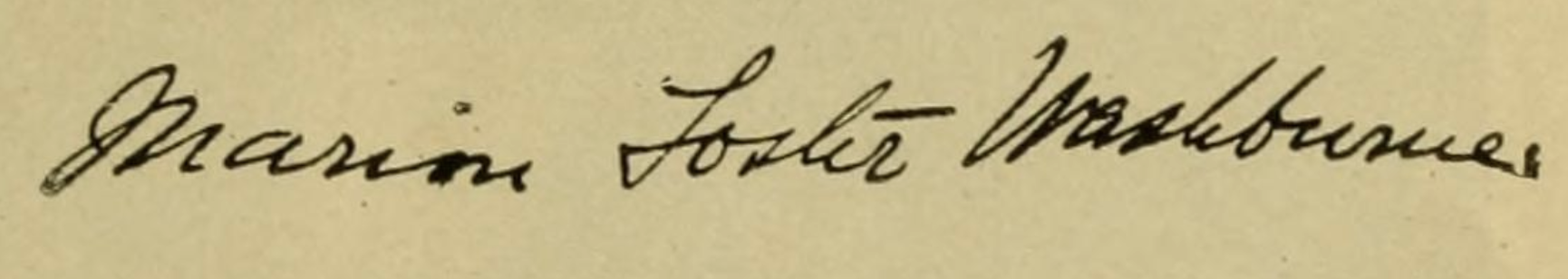

Marion Foster Washburne (née Foster; after first marriage, Washburne; after second marriage, Wotherspoon; 1863-1944) was an American author, journalist, editor, lecturer, and educator. She was the first trained teacher employed to look after education news for a Chicago newspaper. Washburne was associated with the Back-to-the-land movement, serving as president of the national association.

== Early life and education ==
Marion Guyon Foster was born in Northampton, Massachusetts, August 31, 1863. Her father was Dr. Richard Norman Foster (d. 1922). In his day, his record showed the largest number of babies born to a physician in private practise and the lowest mortality. Her mother was Anne (Halsted) Foster. Marion's sister, Edith Burnham (nee Foster) Flint (1873-1948), was one of the first women faculty members at the University of Chicago. John Willock Noble, Secretary of the Interior, was an uncle.

Washburne graduated from Central High School, Chicago, Illinois, 1881; and Chicago Froebel Association Training School, 1893.

She completed an editor course of study at Colonel Parker's Chicago Institute.

== Career ==
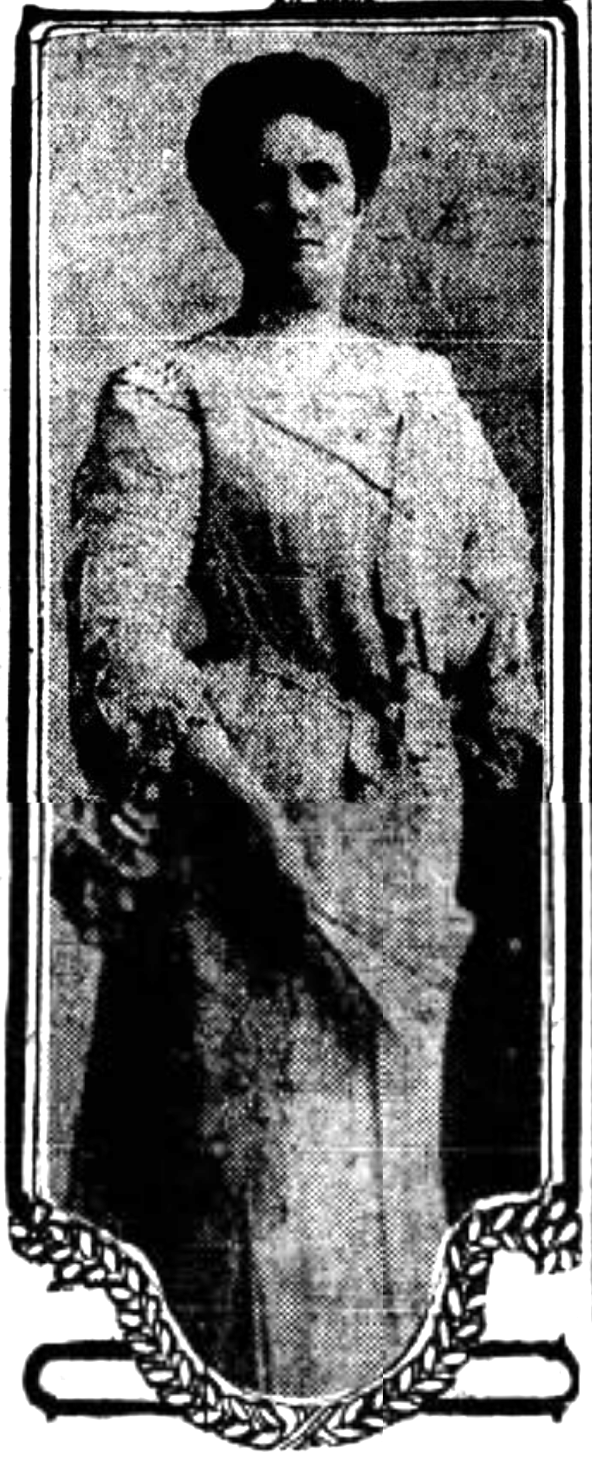
Washburne in 1911

=== Illinois ===
She sold her first story, "Boarding School Adventure" when she was thirteen years old.

Since 1894, Washburne was a newspaper and magazine writer. As school editor of the Chicago Evening Post, she conducted a campaign which resulted in giving Chicago its first Normal School (now Chicago State University). As the delegate from the Little Deaf Child's League, she was instrumental in securing passage by the Illinois State Legislature of a bill providing for public day school oral education of the deaf. She was State organizer and delegate to the National Congress of Mothers (now Parent-Teacher Association).

At Hull House, she taught kindergarten training.

She served on the editorial staff of Harper's Bazar; associate editor, Mothers' Magazine; editor-in-chief, Little Farms Magazine; education editor, Chicago Times-Herald (now Chicago Times) and the Chicago Tribune; (Note: At one time, Washburne was the only woman member on staff at the Chicago Tribune.) and Children's and Mother's department, Sunday Times-Herald.

As a writer, she wrote chiefly on educational subjects in magazines and newspapers. She was the author of: Success Library (Vol. II.), 1901; Everyday Essays, 1904; A Little Fountain of Life, 1904; Study of Child Life, 1907; Family Secrets; Mother's Year Book, 1908; The House on the North Shore, 1909; Old Fashioned Fairy Tales, 1910; Old Fashioned Fairy Tales, 1909; Indian Legends, 1915.

She was the director of esoteric work in the Elgin, Illinois branch of the Oriental Esoteric Society, as well as a student and non-professional lecturer on the philosophies and religions of the East and West.

Besides her writing, in Chicago, Washburne was known as a social worker. With her husband, Dr. Washburne, she founded "Resthaven", a rest sanatorium at Elgin.

Washburne favored woman suffrage; she lectured on suffrage in Illinois and California.

She served as president of the National Back-to-the Land Association; vice-president, Illinois Congress of Mothers; director, Cooperative Commonwealth Company; member, Chicago Woman's Club; member, woman's branch, Republican State Central Committee, Illinois; and member, Chicago Civic Equality League.

During the 1893 World's Columbian Exposition, she was one of a committee of women who went to protest in behalf of the laboring men and women against the Sunday closing of the Fair. She also served as a delegate representing the Chicago Woman's Club before Congress at Washington, D.C. In the same year, she befriended Indian anti-colonialist activista at the World's Parliament of Religions. Her association with Indian nationals led to an indictment but never tried under the Espionage Act.

=== California ===
After removing to Los Angeles County, she became a member of the Friday Morning Club, and also became a member of the American Civil Liberties Union; Pasadena League of Women Voters; Women's Civic League of Pasadena; Pasadena Cooperative Society; and the Women's International League for Peace and Freedom.

In 1911, she began plans in Sierra Madre, California for a model village, Havilah, the Valley of Blessing. It was not a community, but rather a corporation; not a charity, but a business; not a philanthropy, yet it was to have far-reaching beneficence. In October 1911, Dr. and Mrs. Washburne took over the management of El Reposo Sanitorium at Sierra Madre. By 1928, she was residing in Pasadena, California.

== Personal life ==
In Chicago, on June 22, 1886, she married George Foote Washburne, M.D. (1855-1936), professor of pathology, Chicago Homeopathic College. Their children were: Norman Foster, Carleton, Dorothea, and John Noble. Herman Stegeman was a son-in-law.

In 1902, Washburne managed to escape during the Park Avenue Hotel fire.

In 1915, while a resident in Berkeley, California, she married the attorney William Arthur Wotherspoon (1861-1933), of Oceano, California. The moved to San Francisco and began a long history as supporters of left-wing politics, including becoming associated with members of the Ghadar movement.

In 1934, Washburne was the Democratic nominee for California's 48th State Assembly district.

She was associated with the Christian theosophical movement.

== Death ==
Marion Foster Washburne Wotherspoon died in 1944.

== Selected works ==
Every day essays

The mother's year-book

Study of child life

- Talks on teaching, 1893
- Success Library (Vol. II.), 1901
- Everyday Essays, 1904
- A Little Fountain of Life, 1904
- Study of Child Life, 1907
- Family Secrets, 1907
- Mother's Year Book, 1908
- The House on the North Shore, 1909
- Old Fashioned Fairy Tales, 1910
- Indian Legends, 1915
- A Search for a Happy Country, 1940
- I Share My Life with You (2011; posthumously published)
