= Tommy Biddle =

American polo player

Tommy Biddle (a.k.a. Thomas J. Biddle, Jr.) is an American polo player. He is an eight-goaler in outdoor polo and a ten-goaler in arena polo. He has won many national and international tournaments.

== Early life ==
He attended Florida Atlantic University.

== Polo ==
He started his professional polo career at the Gulfstream Polo Club. He is an eight-goal player in outdoor polo and has been a 10-goaler in arena polo since 2012. He is a player-in-residence at the Greenwich Polo Club in Greenwich, Connecticut.

In 2002, he won the U.S. Open Polo Championship at the Royal Palm Polo Club in Boca Raton, Florida on the Coca-Cola Polo Team alongside Gillian Johnston, Miguel Novillo Astrada and Adam Snow. He has also won the Centennial Cup from the Federation of International Polo and the Monty Waterbury Cup.
