= Percy Orthwein =

American heir & business executive (1888-1957)

- Born: November 27, 1888; St. Louis, Missouri, U.S.
- Died: July 2, 1957 (aged 68); Huntleigh, Missouri, U.S.
- Resting place: Sunset Memorial Park and Mausoleum
- Education: Yale University
- Occupation: Businessman
- Spouse: Clara Busch
- Children: Adolphus Busch Orthwein; James Orthwein
- Parent(s): William D. Orthwein; Emily H. Thuemmler
- Relatives: Frederick C. Orthwein (brother); August Anheuser Busch Sr. (father-in-law); Adolphus Busch III (brother-in-law); Gussie Busch (brother-in-law)

Percy Orthwein (November 27, 1888 – July 2, 1957) was an American heir and business executive in advertising from St. Louis, Missouri, United States.

Orthwein was born on November 27, 1888, in St. Louis, Missouri to William D. Orthwein, a German-born grain merchant. The younger Orthwein graduated from Yale University in 1912.

Orthwein was the co-founder and president of the D'Arcy Advertising Company. The firm was in charge of advertising for Anheuser-Busch, the family business.

Orthwein married Clara Hazel Busch, the daughter of August Anheuser Busch Sr., the chief executive officer of Anheuser-Busch. They lived in a mansion designed by Maritz & Young in Huntleigh, Missouri, a suburb of St. Louis. They had two sons: Adolphus Busch Orthwein and James Orthwein.

Orthwein was a hunter and an amateur portraitist.

Orthwein died on July 2, 1957, in Huntleigh. He was buried at the Sunset Memorial Park and Mausoleum in Affton, Missouri, near St. Louis. His wife died of a heart attack one month later.

In 1985, his company, the D'Arcy Advertising Company, merged with Benton & Bowles to form D'Arcy Masius Benton & Bowles.
