= National Clearinghouse on Marital and Date Rape =

The National Clearinghouse on Marital and Date Rape was an American research center that compiled and provided information on date and marital rape cases, and on legislation regarding them, and media publications on these subjects, as well as acting as an advocate for marital and date rape victims. It began in 1978 as a project of the Women's History Research Center, with Laura X as its director. It published a pamphlet on the landmark 1978 Oregon v. Rideout case, in which a man was acquitted of raping his wife; the case was the first time in American history a husband was tried for raping his wife while they were living together. In 1983 the National Clearinghouse on Marital and Date Rape conducted the world's first conference on marital rape. In 2004 the Clearinghouse closed, but it maintains its website for posterity.

== See also ==
- Intimate partner sexual violence
- Marital rape
