= August Busch III =

American businessman (born 1937)

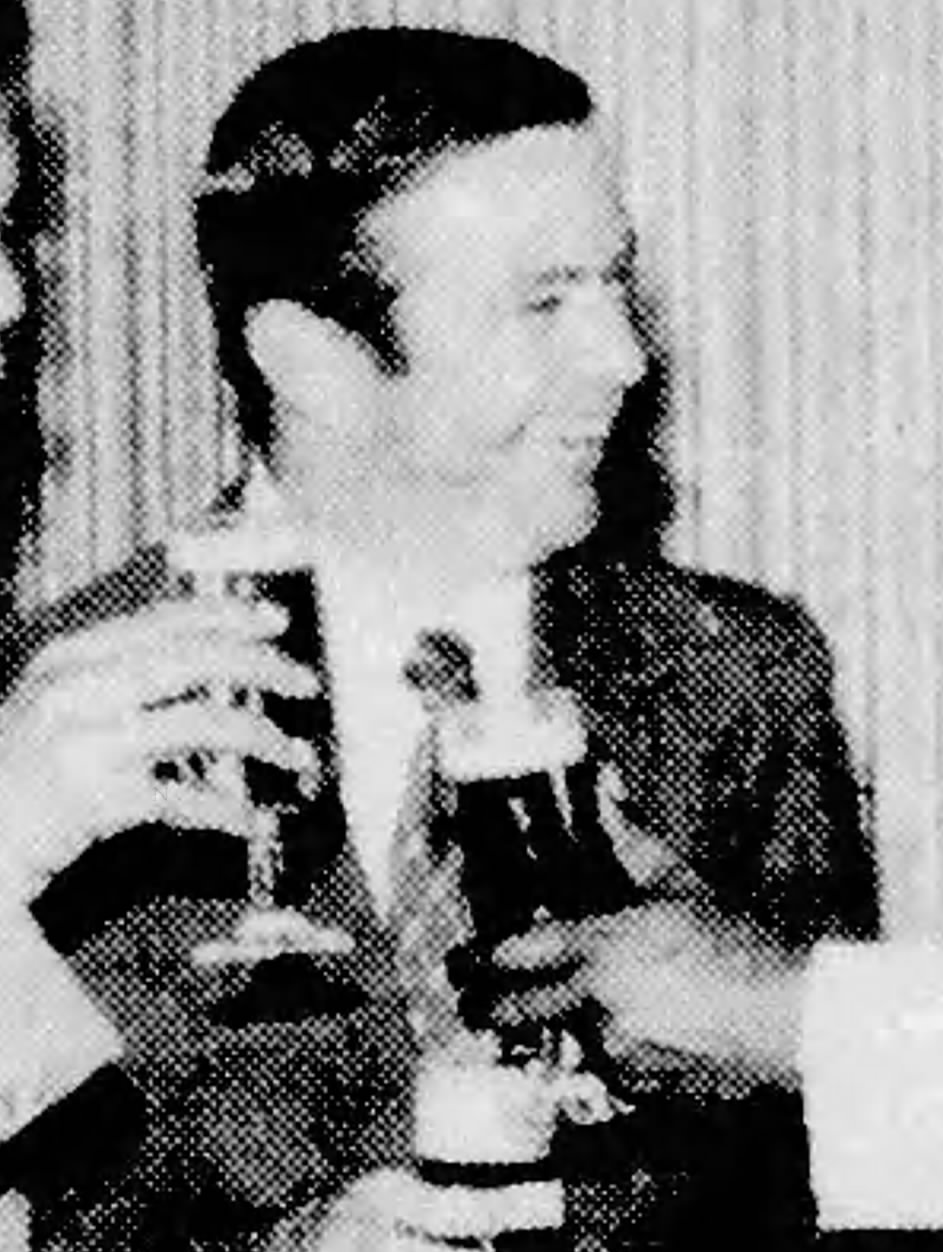
- Busch in 1977
- Born: August Anheuser Busch III; June 16, 1937 (age 89); St. Louis, Missouri, U.S.
- Occupation: World brewing executive
- Spouse(s): Susan Hornibrook, m. 1963, div. 1969; Virginia Lee Wiley, m. 1974
- Children: August A. Busch IV, Susie Busch-Transou, Steven Busch, and Virginia "Ginny" Busch, Michael Ralph Busch
- Parents: August A. "Gussie" Busch Jr. (father); Elizabeth Overton Dozier Busch (mother)

August Anheuser Busch III (born June 16, 1937) is a great-grandson of Anheuser-Busch founder Adolphus Busch and was the company's president, CEO, and chairman from the mid-1970s to 2006. He is informally known as "Auggie" and as "The Third" or "Three Sticks" by subordinates and employees at Anheuser-Busch. He is the father of August Busch IV.

== Early life ==
August Anheuser Busch III was born in St. Louis, Missouri on June 16, 1937. In 1956, he graduated from Ladue Horton Watkins High School. He attended the University of Arizona but dropped out after failing. His father then gave him an ultimatum and he began working in an entry-level position at Anheuser-Busch. Busch graduated from the Course in Brewing Technology at the prestigious Siebel Institute of Technology in Chicago during the 1960–1961 program.

== Career ==
August Busch III served as President of the Anheuser-Busch Companies, Inc. (ABC) from 1974 until June 2002, and as chief executive officer of ABC from 1975 until June 2002. He was also chairman of the Board of Directors from 1977 to 2006.

He was succeeded as the day-to-day operational head of Anheuser-Busch by Patrick Stokes. Stokes' tenure marked the first time in the history of the company that a non-Busch family member ran the day-to-day operations. Busch also conferred the chairmanship to Stokes effective December 1, 2006. Busch retired from his executive functions at the company on November 30, 2006.

Busch has been a director of AT&T Inc. since October 1983. He served as Director of Southwestern Bell Telephone Company from 1980 to 1983, and as Director of Emerson Electric Co. from December 31, 1984 to February 1, 2016. The CEO of SBC/AT&T, Ed Whitacre, simultaneously served on the board of Anheuser-Busch. They were joined on both boards by Charlie Knight, CEO of Emerson Electric. Whitacre also served on the board of Emerson. Busch voted to approve $115 million of pay to Whitacre over a five-year period. Busch is also chairman of the Anheuser-Busch Corporate Governance and Nominating Committee and a member of the Corporate Development Committee and the Executive Committee.

== Personal life ==
He has been married twice. He married his first wife, Susan, in 1963. She is the mother of his two eldest children, August Anheuser Busch IV and Susan Busch-Transou. The marriage ended in divorce in 1969. His second wife, Virginia, who is a practicing attorney, is the mother of his two younger children, Steven Busch and Virginia "Ginny" Busch.

Unlike his father Gussie Busch, August Busch III has been a lifelong supporter of the Republican Party, and was a friend, ally, and financial supporter of Senator John McCain and President George W. Bush. By contrast, August III's eldest son, August A. Busch IV, has been a strong supporter of the Democratic Party, like his grandfather Gussie.

All four of August III's children were involved in the business functions of Anheuser-Busch to varying degrees: August IV was president and CEO of the Anheuser-Busch Companies, Inc.; Susie Busch-Transou and her husband, Tripp, owned Tri-Eagle Sales, a distributorship near Tallahassee, Florida; Steven Busch was his father's executive assistant and now owns Krey Distributing Company in St. Peters, Missouri; and Ginny Busch is employed by Busch Entertainment Company (BEC), working closely with Anheuser-Busch's SeaWorld and Busch Gardens family theme park businesses. Both August A. Busch III and August A. Busch, Jr. were inducted into the Junior Achievement U.S. Business Hall of Fame in 2005.

August Anheuser Busch III was responsible for the donation of Mike IV, the live Bengal tiger mascot of Louisiana State University, in 1976. Mike IV, originally named Jerry, was born in 1974 at Busch Gardens in Tampa, Florida. He was LSU's mascot through the end of 1989 and died in 1995.
