= Patrick Stokes (businessman) =

Patrick T. Stokes
- Born: 1942 (age 83–84); Washington, D.C., U.S.
- Education: Boston College (BA); Columbia Business School (MBA)
- Occupation: World Brewing Executive
- Spouse: Anna Kristine
- Children: David Stokes, Michael Stokes, 1 Daughter
- Parent: Carolyn Stokes

Patrick T Stokes is the former chairman and CEO of Anheuser-Busch Companies, Inc. He served as president and CEO from 2002 to December 2006 and chairman from December 2006 to November 2008.

== Life ==
Stokes was born in Washington, D.C. He attended Xavier High School in New York City, earned a bachelor of science degree in mathematics from Boston College in 1964, where he graduated magna cum laude. He then earned an MBA from Columbia University in 1966. Stokes and his wife Anna Kristine live in St. Louis County. They have three adult children.

== Career ==
After graduating with an MBA from Columbia Business School in 1966, Stokes joined the corporate economics department at Shell Oil Co. in New York. Shortly thereafter, he joined the U.S. Army, and served at 1st Army Headquarters at Fort Meade, Maryland, for two years before signing on with Anheuser-Busch’s corporate planning department in St. Louis in 1969.

A year later, Stokes was promoted to senior analyst, marking the beginning of a series of promotions. In 1972, he was named assistant to August Busch III – then the company’s executive vice president and general manager – and in 1974, was named vice president – raw materials and transportation. In 1976, he was appointed vice president materials acquisition, assuming new responsibilities for can and bottle procurement and malt production.

In 1982, Anheuser-Busch acquired Campbell Taggart, a Dallas-based baking, refrigerated dough and frozen food company. At that time, Stokes was given responsibility for coordinating and consolidating planning and operations with the parent company. In 1984, he was named chief operating officer, and in 1986, he was appointed chairman of the board and president. In 1986, he also was named chairman of the board and chief executive officer for Eagle Snacks, consolidating food operations under his direction. He held these positions until 1990, when he was named president of the brewing subsidiary.

In 1990, Stokes became president of Anheuser-Busch, Inc., the brewing subsidiary of Anheuser-Busch Cos. Inc., a position previously held by August Busch III, who also served as chairman and president of the brewery’s parent company. Under Stokes the company continued to grow and achieve record sales. In 1989, the brewing unit sold 80.7 million barrels of beer and had a market share of 42 percent. In 2004, Anheuser-Busch sold an all-time record 103.0 million barrels of beer domestically, marking the 27th consecutive year of record sales. Today, the company holds nearly 49 percent of the domestic industry.

Stokes was elected to the Anheuser-Busch Cos., Inc. board of directors in 2000. In 2002, he was named president and chief executive officer of Anheuser-Busch Cos., Inc.

In 1991, Stokes was presented with the Boston College Award of Excellence in Commerce. He is currently a member of the Boston College Board of Trustees.
