= William D. Orthwein =

German-born American grain merchant (1841–1925)

- Born: February 9, 1841; Stuttgart, Wurtemberg, Germany
- Died: 1925 (aged 83–84)
- Resting place: Bellefontaine Cemetery, St. Louis, Missouri, U.S.
- Occupation: Businessman
- Spouse: Emily H. Thuemmler
- Children: Frederick C. Orthwein; Percy Orthwein; William R. Orthwein
- Parent(s): Frederick Charles Orthwein; Louise Lidle
- Relatives: Charles F. Orthwein (brother); William R. Orthwein Jr. (grandson)

William David Orthwein (February 9, 1841 – 1925) was a German-born American Civil War veteran and grain merchant in St. Louis, Missouri.

== Early life ==
William David Orthwein was born on February 9, 1841, in Stuttgart, Wurtemberg, Germany. His father was Frederick Charles Orthwein and his mother, Louise Lidle. He had a brother, Charles F. Orthwein.

== Career ==
Orthwein emigrated to the United States in 1860, arriving in Lincoln, Illinois, to work as a salesman. In 1862, he joined his brother in St. Louis, Missouri, to work for his grain commission business, Haenshen & Orthwein. Meanwhile, he served in the Union Army during the American Civil War of 1861–1865.

After the war, Orthwein resumed work for Haenshen & Orthwein. By 1870, he worked for his brother's grain shipping firm, Orthwein & Mersman (co-founded by Charles F. Orthwein and Joseph J. Mersman), up until 1879. The firm shipped grains to Europe from St. Louis, via New Orleans, Louisiana, and Galveston, Texas. In 1879, it became known as Orthwein Brothers, and it was in business until 1893.

Orthwein founded the William D. Orthwein Grain Company in 1893. It was "the oldest grain firm in St. Louis." He hired his son Frederick to work with him until 1900, when he retired.

Orthwein also served as the president of the St. Louis Victoria Flour Mills. He served as the Vice President of the Manufacturers Railway Company, while Adolphus Busch served as its president. He served on the Boards of Directors of the Mississippi Valley Trust Company, the Kinloch Telephone Company, and the St. Louis Merchants Exchange. He was a member of the St. Louis Chamber of Commerce.

== Personal life ==
Orthwein married Emily H. Thuemmler on June 9, 1870. Around 1900, they built the Orthwein Mansion at 15 Portland Place in St. Louis, and lived there for a quarter-century.

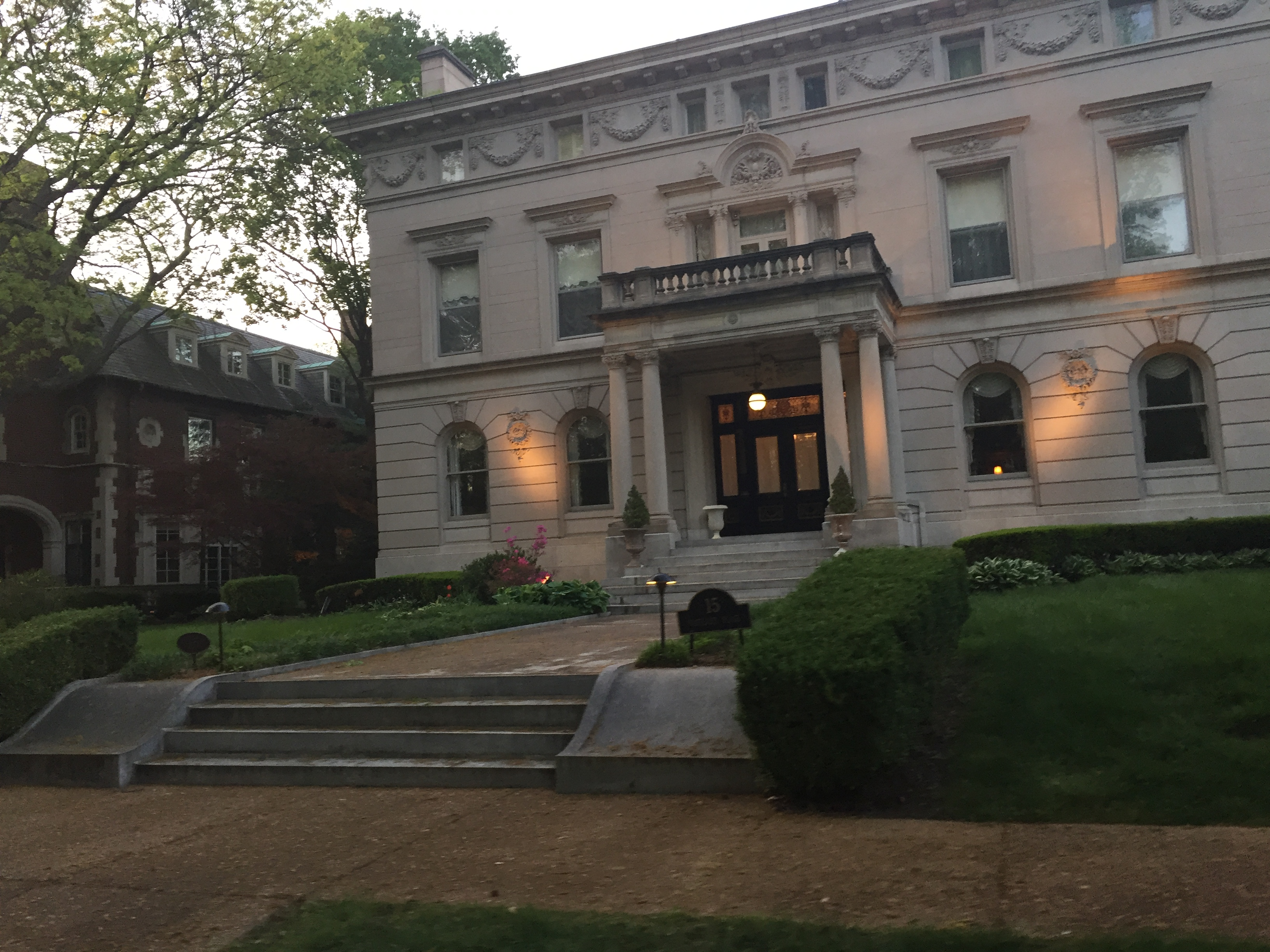
The Othwein Mansion in St. Louis, Missouri.

Orthwein was a member of the Log Cabin Club and the Union Club, two private members' clubs in St. Louis, Missouri. He donated to the Mullanphy Emigrant Relief Fund.

== Death ==
Orthwein died in 1925, leaving an estate of about US$2 million (about $36,700,000 today).
