= Orthwein Mansion =

Historic house in Missouri, United States

- U.S. Historic district – Contributing property
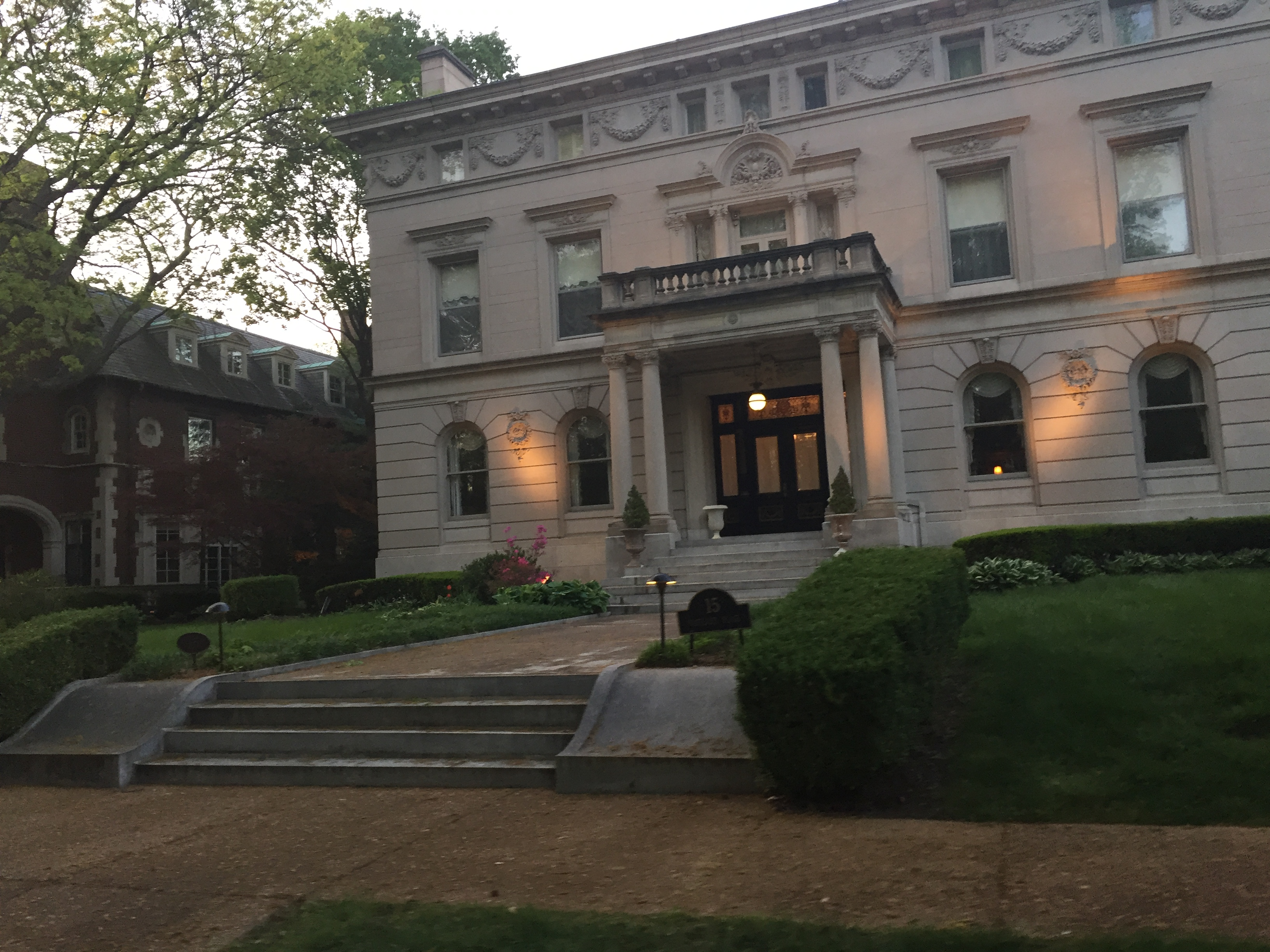
- Orthwein Mansion

- Location within St. Louis Location within Missouri Location within the United States
- Location: 15 Portland Place, St. Louis, Missouri, US
- Coordinates: 38°38′51″N 90°16′01.4″W
- Built: ca. 1900
- Architect: Frederick Widmann; Robert W. Walsh; Caspar D. Boisselier
- Architectural style: Colonial Revival architecture
- Part of: Portland and Westmoreland Places (ID74002276)
- Designated CP: February 12, 1974

The Orthwein Mansion is a historic mansion in St. Louis, Missouri, in the United States. It sits at 15 Portland Place, near the northeastern corner of Forest Park.

The mansion was built c. 1900, for William D. Orthwein, a German immigrant. It was designed in the Neoclassical architectural style, by Frederick Widmann, FAIA (1859-1925), Robert W. Walsh, FAIA (1860-c.1929) and Caspar D. Boisselier.

William D. Orthwein, his wife Emily, and their family lived there for 27 years. Their son William R. Orthwein was living there when he competed at the 1904 Summer Olympics, held in St. Louis, in the freestyle and backstroke swimming and water polo, winning bronze medals in the 4x50-yard freestyle relay and water polo.

The house has been listed on the National Register of Historic Places since February 12, 1974.
