= VLB Berlin =

Institute for Fermentation and Biotechnology, Berlin, Germany

Coordinates: 52.545386°N 13.343094°E

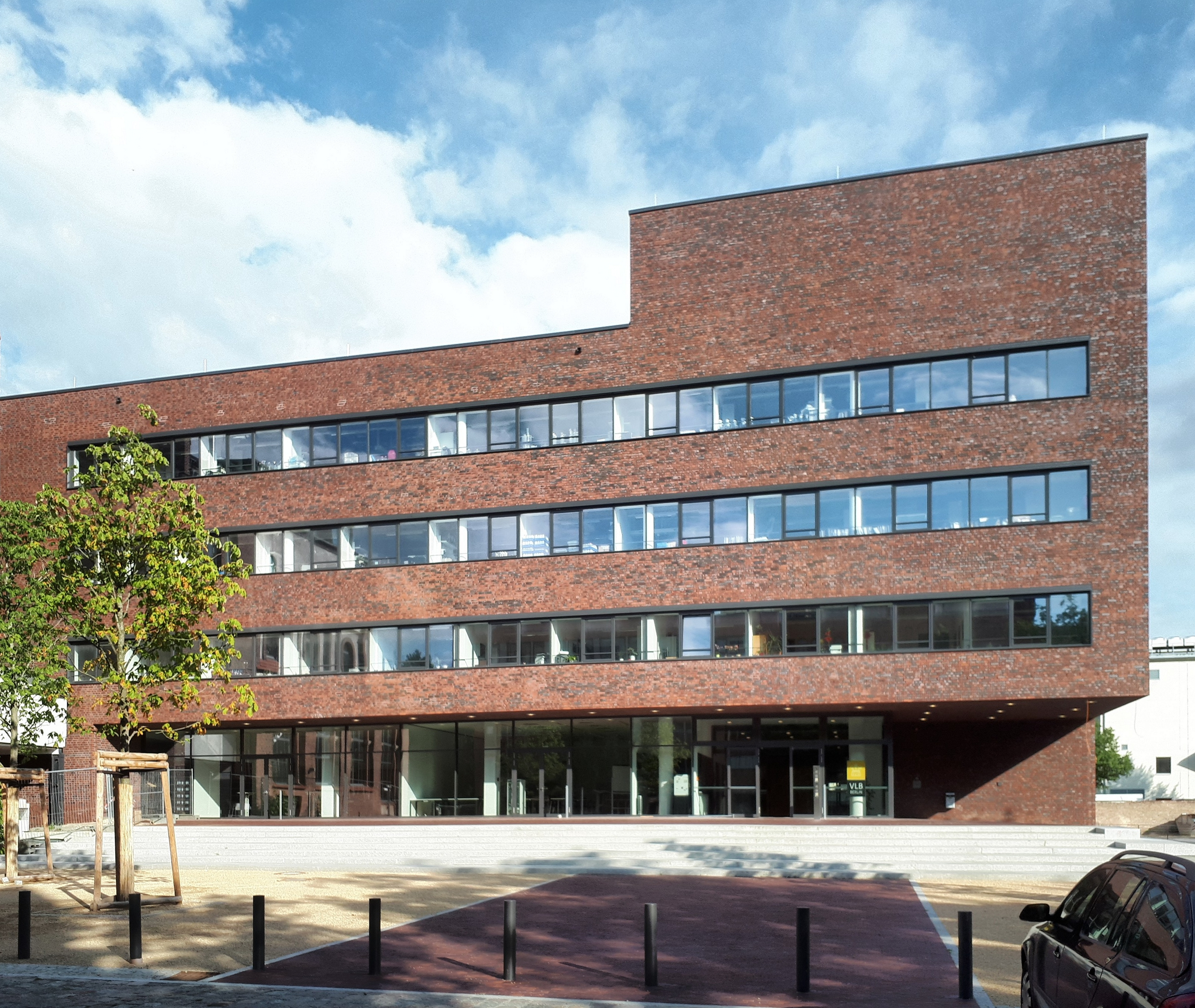

VLB Berlin (Versuch- u. Lehranstalt für Brauerei in Berlin) is the owner of the Institut für Gärungsgewerbe und Biotechnologie zu Berlin (Institute for Fermentation and Biotechnology, Berlin). It is an institute in Berlin's Wedding district that provides research, training, education and service for the brewing industry.

Its education side which cooperates with Technische Universität Berlin which are in English or Russian includes Certified Brewmaster six-month courses which are attended by worldwide brewers including August A. Busch IV.

The VLB was founded in 1883 and moved in 1898 to its current location at Seestraße 13. From 1898 to 1981 it operated the Hochschul Brauerei (which translates to University Brewery).

Among its publications is Technology Brewing and Malting by Wolfgang Kunze.
