= Charles F. Orthwein =

German-born American businessman

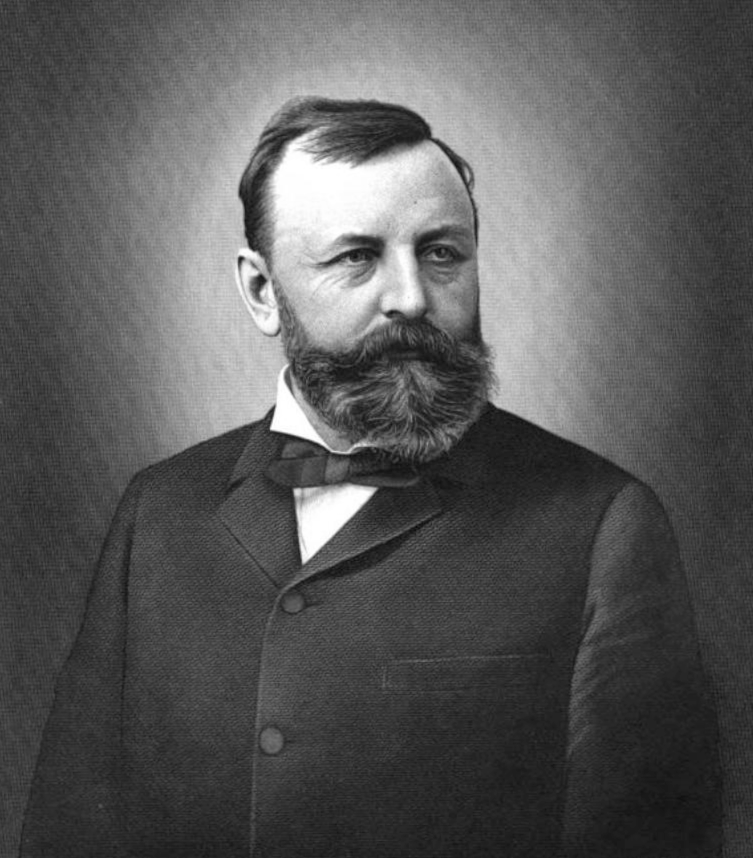
- Born: January 28, 1839; Württemberg, Germany
- Died: December 28, 1898 (aged 59); St. Louis, Missouri, U.S.
- Resting place: Bellefontaine Cemetery
- Occupation: Businessman
- Spouse: Caroline Nulsen (m. 1866)
- Children: 6 sons, 1 daughter
- Relatives: William D. Orthwein (brother)

Charles F. Orthwein (January 28, 1839 – December 28, 1898) was a German-born American businessman from St. Louis, Missouri.

== Early life ==
Charles F. Orthwein was born in Württemberg on January 28, 1839, to Frederick Charles Orthwein and Louise Lidle. He emigrated to the United States in 1860, where he was soon joined by his brother, William D. Orthwein.

== Career ==
Orthwein was a grain merchant and "steel car magnate." In the 1860s, Orthwein co-founded Haenshen & Orthwein, a grain exchange firm in St. Louis. In 1870, Orthwein co-founded Orthwein & Mersman, a grain commission firm, with Joseph J. Mersman. The firm shipped grains to Europe from St. Louis, via New Orleans, Louisiana, and Galveston, Texas. In 1879, Mersman left the business and was replaced by Orthwein's brother William. The firm was renamed Orthwein Brothers and operated until 1893.

In the fall of 1880, Orthwein helped found the St. Louis Mining and Stock Exchange. Orthwein was a member of the St. Louis Merchants Exchange. With Corwin H. Spencer, Orthwein acquired the streetcar system in St. Louis. He became a multi-millionaire.

== Personal life ==
Orthwein married Caroline Nulsen in 1866. They had six sons, Charles C. Orthwein, Max R. Orthwein, Ralph Orthwein, Lee Orthwein, William J. Orthwein, and Armin F. Orthwein, and two daughters, Ruth Orthwein Feuerbacher and Fannie E. Smith.

== Death ==
Orthwein died of liver cancer on December 28, 1898. He was buried at the Bellefontaine Cemetery.
