= Manufacturers Railway (St. Louis) =

Defunct American railway company

Manufacturers Railway Company
Overview
- Headquarters: St. Louis, Missouri
- Reporting mark: MRS
- Locale: Missouri
- Dates of operation: 1887–2011

Technical
- Track gauge: 4 ft 8 1/2 in (1,435 mm) standard gauge

The Manufacturers Railway Company (reporting mark MRS) is a defunct railway company in St. Louis, Missouri. It was owned by Anheuser-Busch.

== History ==
The railway company was founded in 1887 by Adolphus Busch, the president of Anheuser-Busch. By 1906, Busch was still president while William D. Orthwein was vice president.

The company's line connected with the Terminal Railroad Association of St. Louis and the Alton and Southern Railroad in East St. Louis, Illinois. The MRS accessed the Alton and Southern Railroad using trackage rights over the Terminal Railroad Association of St. Louis via the MacArthur Bridge. MRS owned railroad cars used to transport Anheuser-Busch's products. It also provided locomotive maintenance and painting services to other companies.

On March 25, 2011, it was announced that Anheuser-Busch had applied to shut down the MRS, after the brewery began shipping outbound products via truck instead of rail. However, on April 8, Foster Townsend Rail Logistics (reporting marks: FTRL) announced that it planned to take over operations of the line once Manufacturers Railway ceased operations. On October 2, 2011, FTRL Railway began providing rail switching services at Anheuser Busch's St. Louis brewery.

== See also ==
- Anheuser-Busch
