= William R. Orthwein Jr. =

American businessman & philanthropist (1917–2011)

William Robert Orthwein Jr.
- Born: February 12, 1917; St. Louis, Missouri, U.S.
- Died: June 1, 2011 (aged 94); Clayton, Missouri, US
- Education: Yale University
- Occupations: Businessman, philanthropist
- Known for: President, founder McConnell Douglas Automation
- Spouse: Laura Rand
- Children: 3, including Laura X
- Parent(s): William R. Orthwein; Nina Kent Baldwin
- Relatives: William D. Orthwein (greatfather); Frederick C. Orthwein (uncle); Frank C. Rand (father-in-law)

William R. Orthwein Jr. (February 12, 1917 - June 1, 2011) was an American businessman and philanthropist.

== Early life ==
William R. Orthwein Jr. was born February 12, 1917, in St. Louis, Missouri. His father, William R. Orthwein, was a prominent St. Louis attorney and 1948 Missouri candidate for Lieutenant Governor who won a bronze medal in water polo at the 1904 Summer Olympics. His mother Nina Kent Baldwin, was a schoolteacher. He had two brothers, Robert Baldwin Orthwein and David Kent Orthwein. His paternal grandfather, William D. Orthwein (1841–1925), was a German-born grain merchant in St. Louis.

Orthwein was educated at the Rossman School and the St. Louis Country Day School. He graduated from Yale University, where he received a degree in business in 1938.

== Business career ==
Orthwein started his career as a salesman for the General American Life Insurance, now part of MetLife. In 1942, he joined McDonnell Douglas, now Boeing. He served as the president and chairman of one of its subsidiaries, the McDonnell Automation Co., from 1970 to 1982, and served on McDonnell Douglas's board of directors for 36 years from 1975 until his death on June 1, 2011. During his tenure with McDonnell Douglas, the company was considered one of the leading global enterprises in their field. In the 1990s Orthwein was an owner of the New England Patriots professional football franchise.

He served on the boards of directors of the Mercantile Bancorporation and the Microdata Corporation.

== Philanthropy ==
Orthwein was a generous philanthropist in St. Louis, Missouri. Over the years, he and his wife donated millions of dollars to the St. Louis Symphony Orchestra, Saint Louis Science Center, the Missouri Botanical Garden, and the Saint Louis Zoo, where they established the Orthwein Animal Nutrition Center. Orthwein served on the Boards of Trustees of the Boy Scouts of America, the Missouri Historical Society, the United Fund (now the United Way), and St. Luke's Hospital. He also endowed the William R. Orthwein chair at the Washington University School of Law.

Orthwein and his wife founded the William R. and Laura Rand Orthwein Foundation 2004, which had US$33 million under assets by 2009. Through the foundation, Orthwein donated US$2.5 million to the Yale School of Medicine to support scholarship in Ophthalmology and Visual Sciences in 2007. In 2015, posthumously, the foundation donated US$1 million to 'The Muny', an outdoors amphitheater in St. Louis.

== Personal life ==
Orthwein married Laura Hale Rand, the daughter of Frank C. Rand, and the 1938 Queen at the Veiled Prophet Ball. The family resided in Clayton, Missouri. They had three daughters, Nina, Nettie and Laura Orthwein, known later as Laura Shaw Murra and as Laura X, who was 1959 Veiled Prophet Queen.

== Death ==
Orthwein died of pneumonia on June 1, 2011, in Clayton, Missouri. His funeral took place at the Second Presbyterian Church in St. Louis and he was buried at the historic Bellefontaine Cemetery.
