= BackStoppers =

US non-profit organization

The BackStoppers, Inc. Police Officers' and Firefighters' Fund is a federal tax exempt 501(c)(3) non-profit organization. Founded in 1959, the BackStoppers provides ongoing needed financial assistance and support to the spouses and dependent children of all police officers, firefighters and volunteer firefighters, and publicly funded paramedics and EMTs who have lost their lives in the line of duty in 18 counties in Missouri and Illinois. The BackStoppers also provides assistance to first responders who suffer a catastrophic injury performing their duty.

== Assistance ==
The BackStoppers' ongoing assistance eliminates the surviving family's debt, provides health, dental, and vision insurance coverage, reimburses for out-of-pocket medical expenses, covers tuition and educational costs from day care through university, pays home insurance, real estate taxes, and property taxes, and assists with miscellaneous extraordinary expenses.

== Coverage area ==
The BackStoppers serves 13 counties in Missouri and five in Illinois. The Missouri State Highway Patrol Troop C counties served are Cape Girardeau, Franklin, Jefferson, Lincoln, Perry, Pike, St. Charles, St. Francois, St. Louis City, St. Louis County, Ste. Genevieve, Warren, and Washington. The Illinois State Police District 11 counties served are Bond, Clinton, Madison, Monroe, and St. Clair.
