= Stephen A. Orthwein =

American heir and polo player (1945–2018)

- Born: Stephen August Orthwein; October 28, 1945
- Died: March 11, 2018 (aged 72); Florida, U.S.
- Education: Culver Academies
- Alma mater: Yale University He graduated from St. Louis University Law School in 1972.
- Occupation: Polo player
- Parent(s): Adolphus Busch Orthwein; Ann Thornley Metcalfe
- Relatives: Adolphus Busch (paternal great-great-grandfather); Peter Busch Orthwein (brother)

Stephen A. Orthwein (October 28, 1945 – March 11, 2018) was an American heir and polo player.

== Early life ==
He is a great-great-grandson of Adolphus Busch, founder of the Anheuser-Busch Brewing Company. He has a twin brother, Peter Busch Orthwein, the chairman and CEO of Thor Industries. He attended the Culver Academies in 1960. He graduated from Yale University, where he led the team to the National Collegiate Polo Championships in 1967 and 1968.

== Polo ==
A six-goal handicap in polo, he won the Monty Waterbury Cup in 1977, the Butler Handicap in 1979, and the 16-Goal championship in 1967.

He served as secretary of the United States Polo Association (USPA) from 1984 to 1988, president from 1988 to 1991, and chairman from 1991 to 1995. He received the association's Hugo Dalmar Award in 1988. In 2007, he was inducted into the Culver Academies' Horsemanship Hall of Fame.

He served as chairman of the Museum of Polo and Hall of Fame in Lake Worth, Florida, from 2001 to 2010, and was inducted on February 18, 2011. He served on the board of Directors of the Polo Training Foundation.

== Death ==
Orthwein died on March 11, 2018, at his home in Wellington, Florida.

== Bibliography ==
- The Polo Encyclopedia (with Horace A. Laffaye, McFarland & Co, 2003)
