= Peter Busch Orthwein =

American heir, businessman, and polo player (born 1945)

- Born: October 28, 1945 (age 80)
- Education: Choate Rosemary Hall; Cornell University
- Occupations: Businessman, philanthropist, polo player
- Known for: Co-founder and Chairman of Thor Industries
- Spouses: Susan Marston Haas; Beverly Miller
- Children: Peter Busch Orthwein, Jr. Jennifer Orthwein; Lukens Busch Orthwein; Alexander Miller Orthwein; Jason Thornley Orthwein
- Parent(s): Adolphus Busch Orthwein; Mrs. David Metcalfe
- Relatives: Adolphus Busch (paternal great-great-grandfather); Stephen A. Orthwein (brother)

Peter Busch Orthwein (born October 28, 1945) is an American heir, businessman and polo player. He is the co-founder and chairman of Thor Industries.

== Early life ==
His father was Adolphus Busch Orthwein and his mother, Ann Thornley Metcalfe. His paternal great-great-grandfather was Adolphus Busch (1839–1913), the founder of Anheuser-Busch. He has five brothers: Adolphus B. Orthwein II, Stephen A. Orthwein, David Orthwein, Christopher Orthwein, and Michael Montgomery.

He was educated at Choate Rosemary Hall, a boarding-school in Wallingford, Connecticut. He graduated from Cornell University in Ithaca, New York in 1968, where he was the captain on the polo team and a member of Quill and Dagger. He went on to receive a Masters in Business Administration degree from Cornell in 1969.

== Business career ==
He started his career at Bankers Trust, and later worked for Gould Electronics.

In 1980, together with Wade F. B. Thompson, he co-founded Thor Industries, an American manufacturer of recreational vehicles and mid-sized commercial buses. It became a public company in 1984, and it joined the New York Stock Exchange in 1986.

He was its chairman from 1980 to 1986, vice chairman from 1986 to November 2009 and treasurer from 1980 to November 2009. He then was its president from 2009 to 2012. Additionally, since November 2009, he has was its chairman and chief executive officer. On August 1, 2013, he stepped down as CEO but remained chairman.

He also was chairman and CEO of Dutchmen Manufacturing from November 2009 to August 1, 2013.

== Polo ==
In 1969, he played on the Plainsmen team with his brother Stephen, John Armstrong and Charles Armstrong. That year, they came second at the finals of the Royal Windsor Cup at the Guards Polo Club, losing to the Lushill team (Captain Frederick Barker, Howard Hipwood, Peter Perkins, and Peter Gifford). They also lost in the semifinals of the Gold Cup at the Cowdray Park Polo Club at Cowdray Park, West Sussex against the Windsor Park team (Lord Patrick Beresford, his brother John Beresford, 8th Marquess of Waterford, Prince Philip, Duke of Edinburgh and Paul Withers).

He is a player in residence at the Greenwich Polo Club in Greenwich, Connecticut. In 2015, Peter M. Brant honored Orthwein by naming one of the polo fields at the Greenwich Polo Club in his honor.

== Philanthropy ==
He has endowed the Peter B. Orthwein '69 Head Coach of Polo, the Class of 1969 Scholarship (in honor of Professor Jerry Hass) and the Peter B. Orthwein 1968 Sesquicentennial Fellowship in Accounting at his alma mater, Cornell University.

== Personal life ==
On December 30, 1972, he married Susan Marston Haas, the daughter of George Haas, Jr. (1920-2006) of the Haas Financial Corporation, at the Christ & Holy Trinity Church in Westport, Connecticut. The reception was at the Fairfield County Hunt Club.

On May 9, 1987, he married Beverly Miller, a paintings appraiser at Sotheby's, at the Church of the Heavenly Rest on the Upper East Side in New York City. His son, Peter Busch Orthwein, Jr., received an M.B.A. from Cornell University in 2003.
