= Laura X =

American feminist, human rights activist (born 1940)

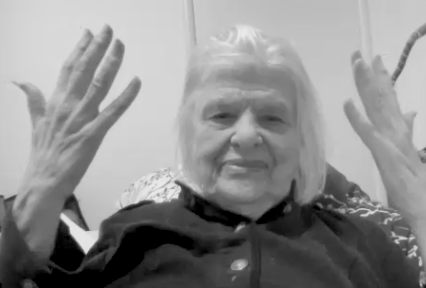
- Laura X at home, February 28, 2022
- Born: Laura Rand Orthwein Jr. 1940 (age 85–86); St. Louis, Missouri, U.S.
- Other name: Laura Shaw Murra (legal name)
- Education: University of California, Berkeley
- Organization(s): Women's History Research Center; National Clearinghouse on Marital and Date Rape
- Known for: Activism against date and marital rape
- Movement: Feminist
- Website: lauraxinstitute.org ncmdr.org

Laura X (born Laura Rand Orthwein Jr., 1940) is an American women's rights advocate. Laura X changed her name in 1962 to Laura Shaw Murra, which remains her legal name. She took the name Laura X on September 17, 1969, to symbolize her rejection of men's legal ownership of women and the anonymity of women's history, which she said was stolen from women and girls. She declared that, like Malcolm X, "I don't want to have my owner's name, either."

== Education and background ==
Laura X was born into the prominent St. Louis Orthwein family and attended the Mary Institute. In 1959, she was crowned Queen of Love and Beauty at the Veiled Prophet Ball. At the time, the role required her to take a year of absence from Vassar College to attend charity functions. At Vassar, Laura co-founded the school's chapter of Committee for a Sane Nuclear Policy and developed a relationship with her mentor John Victor Murra. After Murra's contract ended at Vassar, Orthwein moved with him to New York City.

Laura X taught in the Head Start Program pilot program, having trained at the University of Puerto Rico. She also rose to Picket Captain in CORE (Congress of Racial Equality), attended New York University (NYU), and took graduate courses at Bank Street College of Education. Following her interests and research developed at Vassar College, she worked with the American Committee on Africa to welcome delegates from 17 newly independent states, 16 from Africa, join the UN and to picket Chase Manhattan Bank about their investments in South Africa.

In 1963, she moved to Berkeley, California, and she graduated from the University of California, Berkeley (UC-Berkeley), in 1971, having participated in the Free Speech Movement as well as other social justice movements. She was one of the founders of the newspaper It Ain't Me, Babe, a newspaper published in 1970 by Berkeley Women's Liberation, a feminist organization. The paper has been called "the first feminist newspaper," although that distinction may only be accurate within second-wave feminism in the United States.

In 1977, Laura X became an associate of the Women's Institute for Freedom of the Press (WIFP). WIFP is an American nonprofit publishing organization. The organization works to increase communication between women and connect the public with forms of women-based media. She participated in, and documented, 22 social movements until 2020.

== Women's History Research Center ==
In 1968, Laura X founded the Women's History Research Center in Berkeley, California, the first historical archive connected to the women's liberation movement. She organized a march in Berkeley, California, on International Women’s Day in 1969; International Women's Day had been largely forgotten in the United States before then. Laura X also thought it unfair for half the human race to have only one day a year and called for National Women's History Month to be built around International Women’s Day. The Women’s History Research Center collected nearly one million documents on microfilm, and provided resources and records of the women’s liberation movement that are now available through the National Women’s History Alliance, which carried on their ideas, including successfully petitioning Congress to declare March as Women’s History Month.

By 1970 the Women's History Research Center was widely listed in early feminist publications. The Center put many of the early feminist writings on microfilm, making them available in libraries across the country. In 1978 the Women's History Research Center established the National Clearinghouse on Marital and Date Rape in Berkeley, California, with Laura X as director.

The Women's History Research Center eventually closed, and its collections are now held in the women's history archive at the Schlesinger Library, which is part of Harvard University's Radcliffe Institute for Advanced Study, and at other institutions. The microfilm copies have been distributed through Primary Source Media/Cengage Learning to some 450 libraries in fourteen countries.

== Marital and date rape legislation ==
In 1979 Laura X led a successful campaign to make marital rape a crime in California. She also acted as a consultant to 45 other state campaigns on marital and date rape, as well as collecting and maintaining documents about the status of exemptions from prosecution in rape laws. Repeal of date and marital rape exemptions occurred in 45 states, in Federal and military law, in the laws of Guam and Puerto Rico, and the laws of twenty other countries.

As the leader of NCMDR’s campaign against marital rape, Laura X appeared on dozens of local and national TV and radio shows, including 60 Minutes, The Phil Donahue Show, Seattle Today, Sally Jessie Raphael, Geraldo, the Today Show, CBS News, and the Gary Collins show.

In September 1999 Laura X published her memoir "Accomplishing the Impossible: an Advocate's Notes from the Successful Campaign to Make Marital and Date Rape a Crime in All 50 U.S. States and Other Countries" in Violence Against Women: An International and Interdisciplinary Journal.

== Awards and recognitions ==
- Commendation by the American Library Association, 1971
- Woman of Achievement award (from Mademoiselle magazine)
- World Congress of Victimology Award for Innovative Programs and Services.
- Commendation Surgeon General C. Everett Koop, 1985.
- In 2009, Laura X was honored by the University of Missouri St. Louis (UMSL) with the Trailblazers Award.
