= Mississippi Valley Trust Company Building =

- U.S. National Register of Historic Places
- St. Louis Landmark
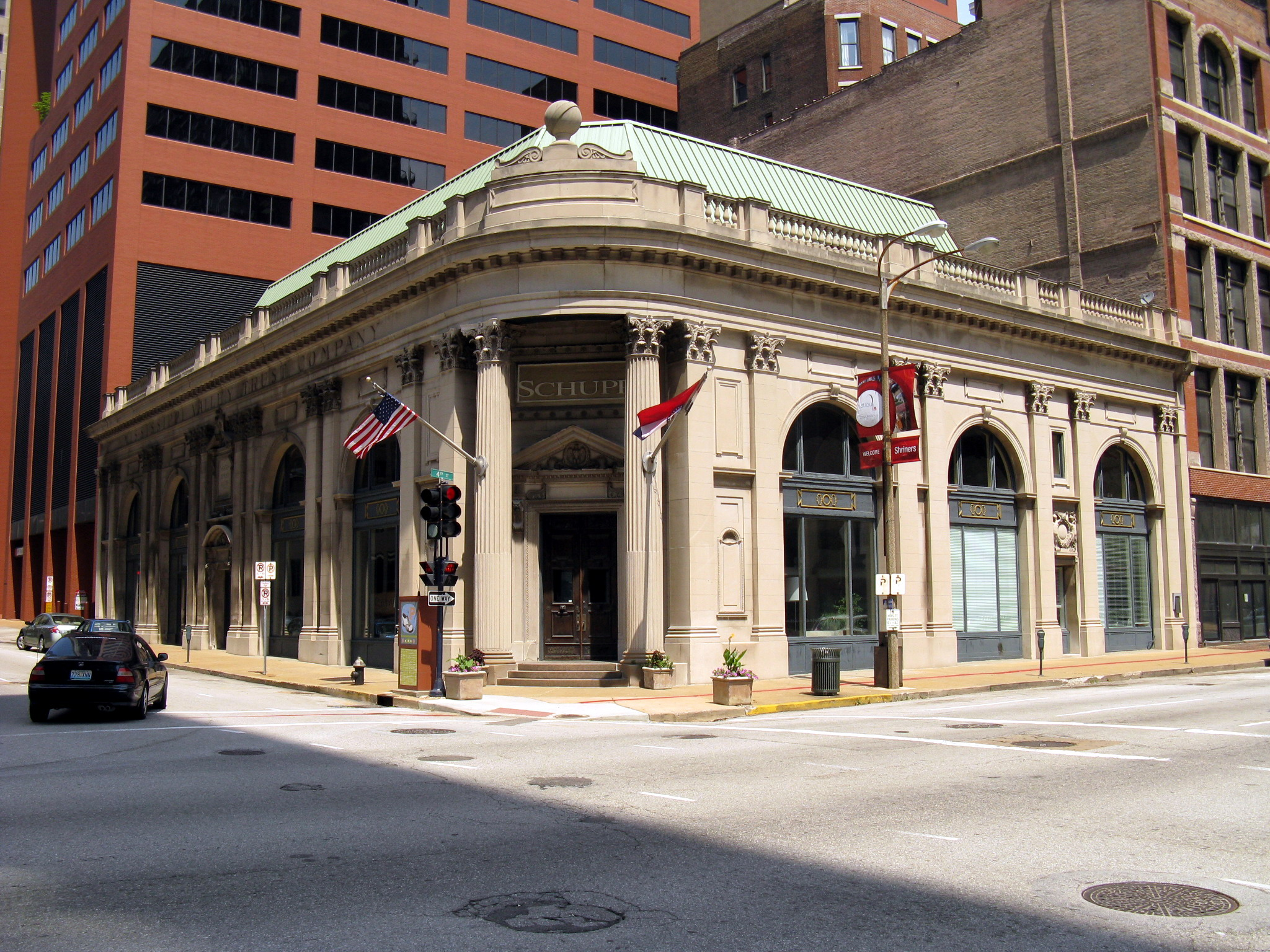
- The Mississippi Valley Trust Company Building in 2008

- Location within St. Louis Location within Missouri Location within the United States
- Location: 401 Pine Street, St. Louis, Missouri
- Coordinates: 38.6270°N 90.1885°W
- Built: 1896
- Architect: Eames & Young
- Architectural style: Beaux-Arts
- NRHP reference No.: 01000544

The Mississippi Valley Trust Company Building is a historic building in 401 Pine Street in the Downtown area of St. Louis, Missouri, United States.. The two-story building was completed in 1896. It was designed by architectural firm Eames & Young in the Beaux-Arts architectural style.

It was home to the Mississippi Valley Trust Company, a local bank which "financed transportation and communication networks in the St. Louis region, and was a supporter of the St. Louis World's Fair". The bank was later acquired by the Mercantile Bancorporation, which was in turn acquired by the Firstar Corporation, and eventually U.S. Bancorp. Later, the building was home to a restaurant. It is now home to TechArtista, a St. Louis-based coworking space with multiple locations in the city. It is also home to a coffee shop and cocktail bar called Trust, an homage to the building's origins.

It has been listed on the National Register of Historic Places since May 25, 2001. Additionally, it has been designated as a city landmark by the City of St. Louis, Missouri. Furthermore, it is the third location on the Let's Roam Saint Louis Architectural Scavenger Hunt.

== See also ==
- National Register of Historic Places listings in Downtown and Downtown West St. Louis
