= Huntleigh, Missouri =

- City
- Location of Huntleigh, Missouri

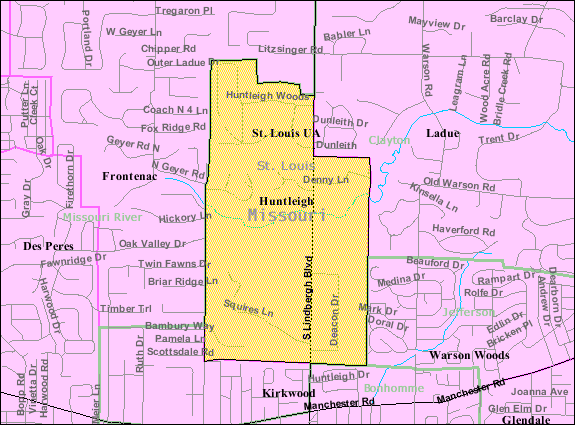
- U.S. Census map
- Coordinates: 38°36′58″N 90°24′39″W
- Country: United States
- State: Missouri
- County: St. Louis

Area
  - Total: 0.99 sq mi (2.57 km^{2})
  - Land: 0.99 sq mi (2.57 km^{2})
  - Water: 0 sq mi (0.00 km^{2})
- Elevation: 551 ft (168 m)

Population (2020)
  - Total: 361
  - Density: 364.4/sq mi (140.71/km^{2})
- Time zone: UTC-6 (Central (CST))
  - Summer (DST): UTC-5 (CDT)
- FIPS code: 29-33850
- GNIS feature ID: 2394453
- Website: huntleigh.org

Huntleigh is a city in St. Louis County, Missouri, United States. As of the 2020 census, Huntleigh had a population of 361.

== History ==
The community, most of which encompasses what was the original 650-acre (260 ha) 1700s farm of Stephen Maddox, is residential, with no commercial or industrial uses. Police services are provided by the city of Frontenac. Huntleigh was incorporated in 1929 and occupied 450 acres (180 ha). It annexed land in 1937 and 1947 (when it acquired Huntleigh Woods) to reach its current size of 750 acres (300 ha). In 1927, August Anheuser Busch, Sr. co-founded (with early town resident Edward E. Bakewell, Sr.) the Bridlespur Hunt, a fox hunting club that was based in the community. The hunts now take place in St. Charles County, although some residents still have their stables in the community. Its residents are among the wealthiest people in St. Louis, particularly members of the Busch and Moran families, including August Busch IV.

== Geography ==
According to the United States Census Bureau, the city has a total area of 1.00 square mile (2.59 km^{2}), all land.

== Demographics ==
Historical population
Census	Pop.	Note	%±
1930	79		—
1940	168		112.7%
1950	180		7.1%
1960	375		108.3%
1970	714		90.4%
1980	428		−40.1%
1990	390		−8.9%
2000	323		−17.2%
2010	334		3.4%
2020	361		8.1%
U.S. Decennial Census

=== 2020 census ===
Huntleigh city, Missouri – Racial and ethnic composition Note: the US Census treats Hispanic/Latino as an ethnic category. This table excludes Latinos from the racial categories and assigns them to a separate category. Hispanics/Latinos may be of any race.
Race / Ethnicity (NH = Non-Hispanic)	Pop 2000	Pop 2010	Pop 2020	% 2000	% 2010	% 2020
White alone (NH)	314	304	320	97.21%	91.02%	88.64%
Black or African American alone (NH)	0	3	1	0.00%	0.90%	0.28%
Native American or Alaska Native alone (NH)	0	0	0	0.00%	0.00%	0.00%
Asian alone (NH)	0	7	10	0.00%	2.10%	2.77%
Native Hawaiian or Pacific Islander alone (NH)	0	0	0	0.00%	0.00%	0.00%
Other race alone (NH)	0	3	1	0.00%	0.90%	0.28%
Mixed race or Multiracial (NH)	3	10	13	0.93%	2.99%	3.60%
Hispanic or Latino (any race)	6	7	16	1.86%	2.10%	4.43%
Total	323	334	361	100.00%	100.00%	100.00%

=== 2010 census ===
As of the census of 2010, there were 334 people, 121 households, and 94 families living in the city. The population density was 334.0 inhabitants per square mile (129.0/km^{2}). There were 136 housing units at an average density of 136.0 per square mile (52.5/km^{2}). The racial makeup of the city was 91.3% White, 0.9% African American, 2.1% Asian, 2.7% from other races, and 3.0% from two or more races. Hispanic or Latino of any race were 2.1% of the population.

There were 121 households, of which 28.1% had children under the age of 18 living with them, 71.1% were married couples living together, 5.8% had a female householder with no husband present, 0.8% had a male householder with no wife present, and 22.3% were non-families. 19.8% of all households were made up of individuals, and 12.4% had someone living alone who was 65 years of age or older. The average household size was 2.76 and the average family size was 3.22.

The median age in the city was 48 years. 26.9% of residents were under the age of 18; 6.7% were between the ages of 18 and 24; 11.4% were from 25 to 44; 33.6% were from 45 to 64; and 21.6% were 65 years of age or older. The gender makeup of the city was 51.2% male and 48.8% female.

=== 2000 census ===
As of the census of 2000, there were 323 people, 122 households, and 103 families living in the city. The population density was 324.4 inhabitants per square mile (125.3/km^{2}). There were 135 housing units at an average density of 135.6 per square mile (52.4/km^{2}). The racial makeup of the city was 99.07% White, and 0.93% from two or more races. Hispanic or Latino of any race were 1.86% of the population.

There were 122 households, out of which 26.2% had children under the age of 18 living with them, 78.7% were married couples living together, 3.3% had a female householder with no husband present, and 14.8% were non-families. 14.8% of all households were made up of individuals, and 9.8% had someone living alone who was 65 years of age or older. The average household size was 2.65 and the average family size was 2.88.

In the city, the population was spread out, with 22.3% under the age of 18, 4.3% from 18 to 24, 17.0% from 25 to 44, 28.5% from 45 to 64, and 27.9% who were 65 years of age or older. The median age was 49 years. For every 100 females, there were 103.1 males. For every 100 females age 18 and over, there were 96.1 males.

The median income for a household in the city was in excess of $200,000, as is the median income for a family. Males had a median income of over $100,000 versus $15,833 for females. The per capita income for the city was $104,420. 1.3% of the population and 2.2% of families were below the poverty line. None of those under the age of 18 and none of those 65 and older were living below the poverty line.
