= George Baker =

George Baker may refer to:

== Arts ==
- George Baker (British actor) (1931–2011), British film and television actor
- George Baker (art historian) (born 1970), American art historian
- George Baker (Indian actor) (born 1946), Indian actor and politician
- George Baker (baritone) (1885–1976), British singer
- George Baker (cartoonist) (1915–1975), Sad Sack comic strip
- George Baker (Dutch singer) (born 1944), Dutch singer and songwriter
  - George Baker Selection, Dutch pop music group
- George Baker (organist) (1773–1847), English musician
- George C. Baker (born 1951), composer and organist
- George D. Baker (1868–1933), American film director
- George Herbert Baker (1878–1943), American Impressionist artist
- George Melville Baker (1832–1890), American playwright and publisher
- George Pierce Baker (1866–1935), American drama professor
- George Philip Baker (1879–1951), British author
- George Augustus Baker (1821–1880), American portrait painter

== Politics ==
- George Baker (Canadian politician) (born 1942), Canadian senator
- George Baker (died 1723), British politician
- George Baker (mayor) (1825–1910), British industrialist, politician and philanthropist, mayor of Birmingham
- George Barnard Baker (1834–1910), Canadian politician from Quebec
- George Ellis Baker (1816–1887), member of the New York State Assembly
- George F. Baker (politician) (1849–1882), American politician
- George H. Baker (1859–1928), American politician in the state of Washington
- George Harold Baker (1877–1916), Canadian politician and lawyer
- George Luis Baker (1868–1941), mayor of Portland, Oregon, 1917–1933
- George W. C. Baker (1872–1953), councilman on the Los Angeles City Council, 1931–1937

== Religion ==
- Father Divine (c. 1876–1965), American religious leader whose real name was possibly George Baker
- George Baker (bishop) (fl. 1661–1665), Bishop of Waterford and Lismore
- George Baker (archdeacon of Totnes) (1687–1772), British Anglican priest
- George Baker (dean of Antigua) (fl. 1926–1970), Barbadian Anglican priest
- A. George Baker (1849–1918), American Protestant clergyman who converted to Islam

== Sports ==
- George Baker (baseball) (1857–1915), Major League Baseball player
- George Baker (cricketer, born 1838) (1838–1870), English cricketer, played for Kent
- George Baker (cricketer, born 1849) (1849–1879), English cricketer, played for Middlesex
- George Baker (cricketer, born 1862) (1862–1938), English cricketer, played for Yorkshire and Lancashire
- George Baker (New Zealand cricketer) (1895–1962), New Zealand cricketer
- George Baker (footballer) (1936–2024), Welsh international footballer
- George Baker (jockey), English jockey
- George Baker (field hockey) (born 2002), field hockey player from New Zealand

== Others ==
- Sir George Baker (judge) (1910–1984), British judge
- George Baker (inventor) (1844–1894), American submarine inventor
- George Baker (officer) (1794–1859), British military officer.
- George Baker (surgeon) (1540–1600), English surgeon
- George Baker (topographer) (1781–1851), topographer and historian of Northampton, England
- George Baker (geologist) (1908–1975), Australian mineralogist and academic
- George Charlie Baker (fl. 2006), perpetrator of the murder of Liam Ashley
- George Fisher Baker (1840–1931), American banker and philanthropist
- George Percival Baker (1856–1951), British botanist, mountaineer, and textile merchant and collector
- George P. Baker (dean of Harvard Business School) (1903–1995), fifth dean of the Harvard Business School
- George P. Baker (Herman C. Krannert Professor) (fl. 1987–present), American
- Sir George Baker, 1st Baronet (1722–1809), British physician
- Sir George Sherston Baker (1846–1923), British barrister and judge
