= Robert Early Strawbridge Jr. =

American polo champion

- Strawbridge, playing on the Hurricane team in the Open Polo Championships, Meadowbrook Club, 1934

Chairman of the United States Polo Association
- In office 1936–1950
- Preceded by: Elbridge T. Gerry Sr.
- Succeeded by: Devereux Milburn

Personal details
- Born: November 17, 1896
- Died: March 6, 1986 (aged 89) Chatham, Pennsylvania
- Spouse: Florence Julia Loew (m. 1931; died 1973)
- Children: 2
- Education: Harvard University

Robert Early Strawbridge Jr. (November 17, 1896 – March 6, 1986) was an American polo champion and chairman of the United States Polo Association.

== Early life ==
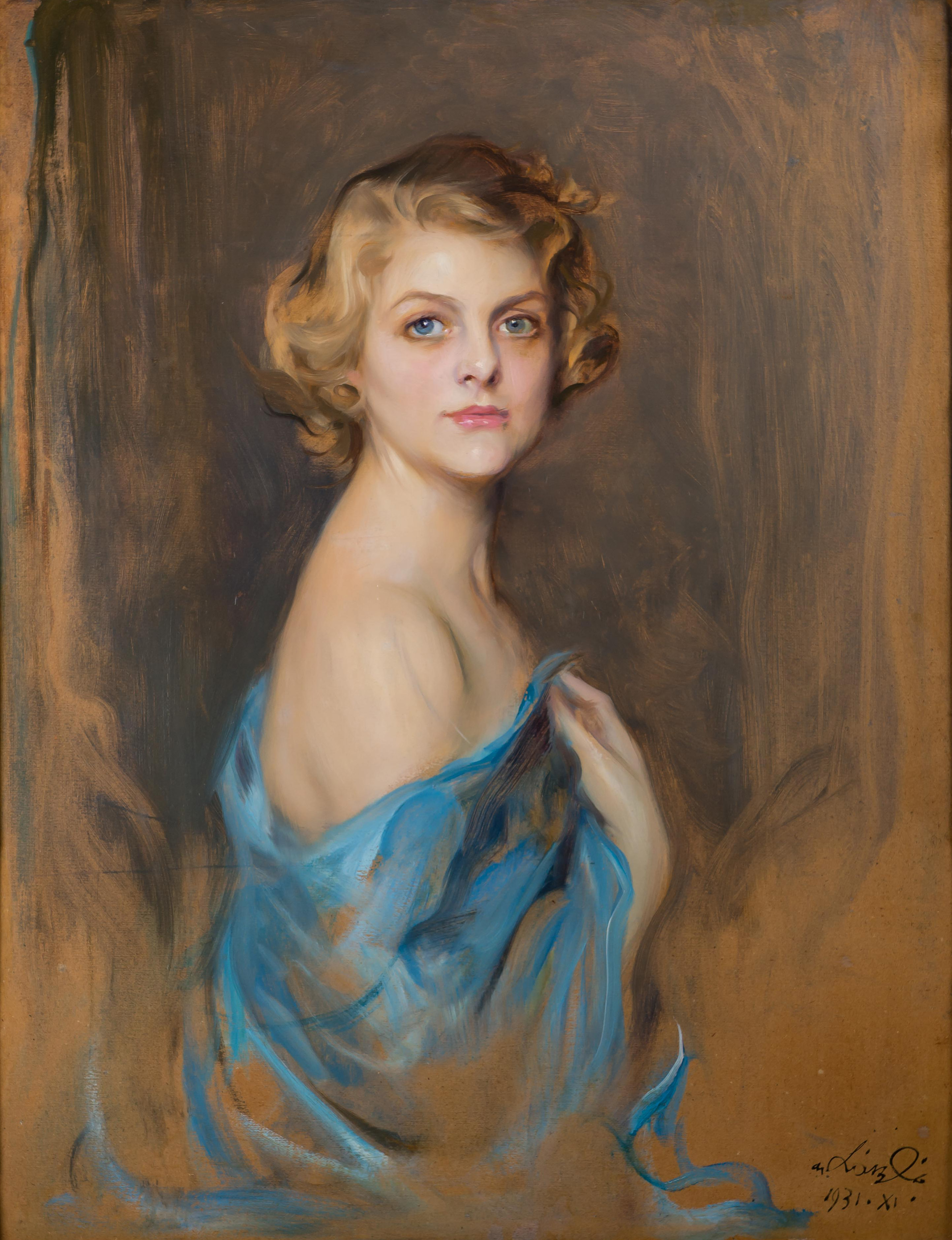
Portrait of Robert's sister, Anita Strawbridge Grosvenor, by Philip de László, 1931.

He was born on November 17, 1896, to Anita (née Berwind) Strawbridge (1875–1942), and Robert E. Strawbridge, former president of the Strawbridge & Clothier department store in Philadelphia. His sister was Anita Strawbridge (wife of Lt. Cmdr. Hon. Theodore P. Grosvenor).

His paternal grandfather was Justus Clayton Strawbridge, who founded Strawbridge & Clothier in 1868. His maternal grandfather was Charles Frederick Berwind, founder of the Berwind-White Coal Mining Company. His aunt, Frederica, was the wife of banker Henry Herman Harjes, J.P. Morgan's partner in France. His two other maternal aunts were Gertrude, Baroness Boecklin, and Edith, Baroness Von Kleist. From his great-aunt Julia Berwind, he received a legacy of $170,000.

He attended Harvard University from 1915 to 1917.

== Career ==
Strawbridge was a lifelong sportsman. In 1913, his father had been made M.F.H. of the famous Cottesmore Hunt, becoming the first American to become master of an English pack of foxhounds. In the 1920s and 1930s, Strawbridge Jr. was one of the nation's leading polo players earning a 9-goal handicap. In 1924, he was a member of the Meadow Brook team that "wrested the historical International Challenge Cup from the English team in International Field, L.I., when the Prince of Wales was among the spectators." He was elected chairman of the United States Polo Association in 1936 and retained the post for two decades until 1950 when he was succeeded by Devereux Milburn. He was inducted into the Museum of Polo and Hall of Fame in 1996.

In 1938, Strawbridge served as chairman of the Salvation Army annual fundraising appeal. Beginning in 1942, Strawbridge was partner of the former New York investment banking firm of Reynolds, Fish & Company. During World War II, he was a lieutenant commander in the United States Navy Reserve assigned to duty with the Office of Strategic Services in London and Washington. He also served as a member of the executive committee of the United Service Organizations, the advisory board of the Salvation Army, and the Army and Navy Committee of the Y.M.C.A. He was a member of the board of managers of Sloan-Kettering Memorial Hospital.

== Personal life ==
On August 15, 1931, Strawbridge was married to Miss Porter's School alumnus Florence Julia Loew (1901–1972) at Trinity Church in Newport, Rhode Island. Florence was a daughter of William Goadby Loew and the former Florence Bellows Baker (a daughter of financier George Fisher Baker, one of the wealthiest men in America). She grew up in her parents' townhouse at 56 East 93rd Street and their estates in Newport and Tuxedo Park. Together, they were the parents of a son and a daughter:

- Robert Early Strawbridge III, who married Alexandra White, daughter of Ogden White and granddaughter of Alexander Moss White (founder of White Weld & Co.), in 1964.
- Florence T. Strawbridge, who married Michael McDonough, son of Charles J. McDonough of Buffalo, New York, in June 1965.

He was a member of a number of clubs, including the Philadelphia Club, the Rabbit Club, the Merion Cricket Club and the Rose Tree Fox Hunt.

Strawbridge died at his farm in Chatham, Pennsylvania, on March 6, 1986, after suffering a series of strokes. He was buried in Church of the Redeemer Cemetery in Bryn Mawr, Pennsylvania.
