= George F. Baker =

George F. Baker may refer to:

- George Fisher Baker (1840–1931) American financier and philanthropist
- George Baker (baseball) (1857–1915), American baseball player
- George F. Baker (politician) (1849–1882), American politician

== See also ==
- George Baker (disambiguation)
