= George Ellis Baker =

American politician

Member of the New York State Assembly for Kings County
- In office January 1, 1851 – December 31, 1851
- Preceded by: Joseph A. Yard
- Succeeded by: John Berry

Personal details
- Born: March 16, 1816 Dedham, Massachusetts, U.S.
- Died: October 2, 1887 (aged 71) Washington, D.C., U.S.
- Resting place: Oak Hill Cemetery; Washington, D.C., U.S.
- Party: Whig
- Spouse: Eveline Stevens
- Relations: Florence Bellows Baker (granddaughter)
- Children: George Fisher Baker; Martha Baker Schley; Eva Frances Baker
- Parent(s): John Baker II; Patty Ellis Baker

George Ellis Baker (March 16, 1816 – October 2, 1887) was an American merchant, town clerk and state legislator.

== Early life ==
Baker was born on March 16, 1816, in Dedham, Massachusetts. He was the eldest son of six children born to John Baker (1780–1843) and Patty (née Ellis) Baker (1791–1876). His father served as the sheriff of Norfolk County from 1834 until his death in 1843. His brother was Fisher Ames Baker, a prominent and successful attorney who had served in the Civil War. (Note: Baker's son, George Fisher Baker, donated funds to Dartmouth College in memory of his uncle, Fisher Ames Baker, Dartmouth class of 1859, for the construction of the Fisher Ames Baker Memorial Library, which opened in 1928.)

Baker was descended from Richard Baker, who landed in the Massachusetts Bay Colony in 1635 and settled in Dorchester. After five generations in Dorchester, the Bakers moved to Dedham, Massachusetts.

== Career ==
Baker moved to Troy, New York, where he opened a shoe store. The business was not a success, so he relocated again to Williamsburg, Brooklyn in the early 1840s before opening another shoe store on Maiden Lane in Manhattan. While this store failed to catch on, Baker successfully became involved in politics.

He was clerk of the board of trustees of the village of Williamsburg and a census taker. In 1850, he was elected on the Whig ticket to the New York State Assembly which met in Albany from January 7 to July 11, 1851, during the first year of Washington Hunt's governorship. While in Albany, he attached himself to former governor and then U.S. Senator William Henry Seward, serving as his private secretary in the 1860's. After President Abraham Lincoln appointed Seward U.S. Secretary of State, Seward had Baker appointed disbursing clerk and administrator of the Secret Service Fund.

== Personal life ==
Baker was married to Eveline Stevens (1817–1903). She was a daughter of James Stevens and granddaughter of Capt. William C. Stevens of the Continental Army. Together, they were the parents of:

- George Fisher Baker (1840–1931), who married Florence Tucker Baker, a daughter of Benjamin Franklin Baker, in 1869.
- Martha Elizabeth Baker (1842–1910), who married banker Grant Barney Schley.
- Eveline Frances Baker (1844–1867), who died unmarried at age 23.

Baker died in Washington, D.C., on October 2, 1887. He was buried at Oak Hill Cemetery there. His widow died in 1903 and was also buried in Washington, D.C.

=== Descendants ===
Through his son George, he was a grandfather of Evelyn Baker (who married Howard Bligh St. George); Florence Bellows Baker (who married William Goadby Loew); and George Fisher Baker Jr. (who married Edith Brevoort Kane; their daughter Elizabeth married John M. Schiff and their son, George F. Baker III married Frances Drexel Munn, a daughter of Mary Astor Paul and member of the Drexel banking family).

Through his daughter Martha, he was a grandfather of Chaloner Baker Schley; Grant Barney Schley Jr.; Evander "Van" Baker Schley (who married Sophie Beverly Duer, a granddaughter of U.S. Representative William Duer, in 1931); Evelyn Baker (wife of Max Howell Behr, brother to Karl Behr) and aviator Kenneth Baker Schley.

New York State Assembly
Preceded by Joseph A. Yard	New York State Assembly; Kings County, 1st District; 1851–1851	Succeeded by John Berry
