= Walker & Gillette =

New York City architectural firm

- Industry: Architecture
- Founder: A. Stewart Walker and Leon N. Gillette
- Headquarters: New York City, United States
- Number of locations: built commercial and residential buildings in New York, Florida, Massachusetts and more

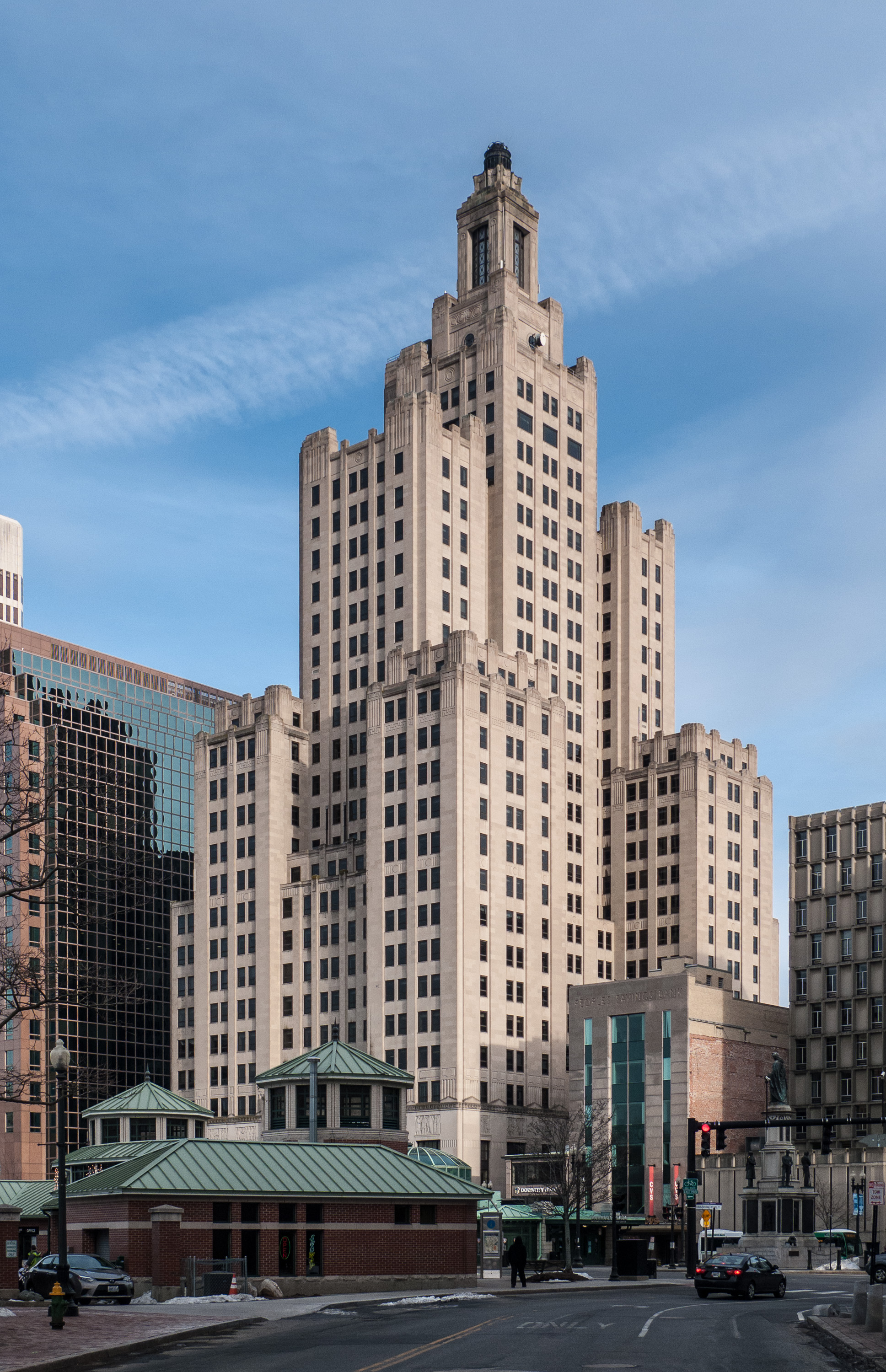
Industrial Trust Tower (1927), Providence, Rhode Island

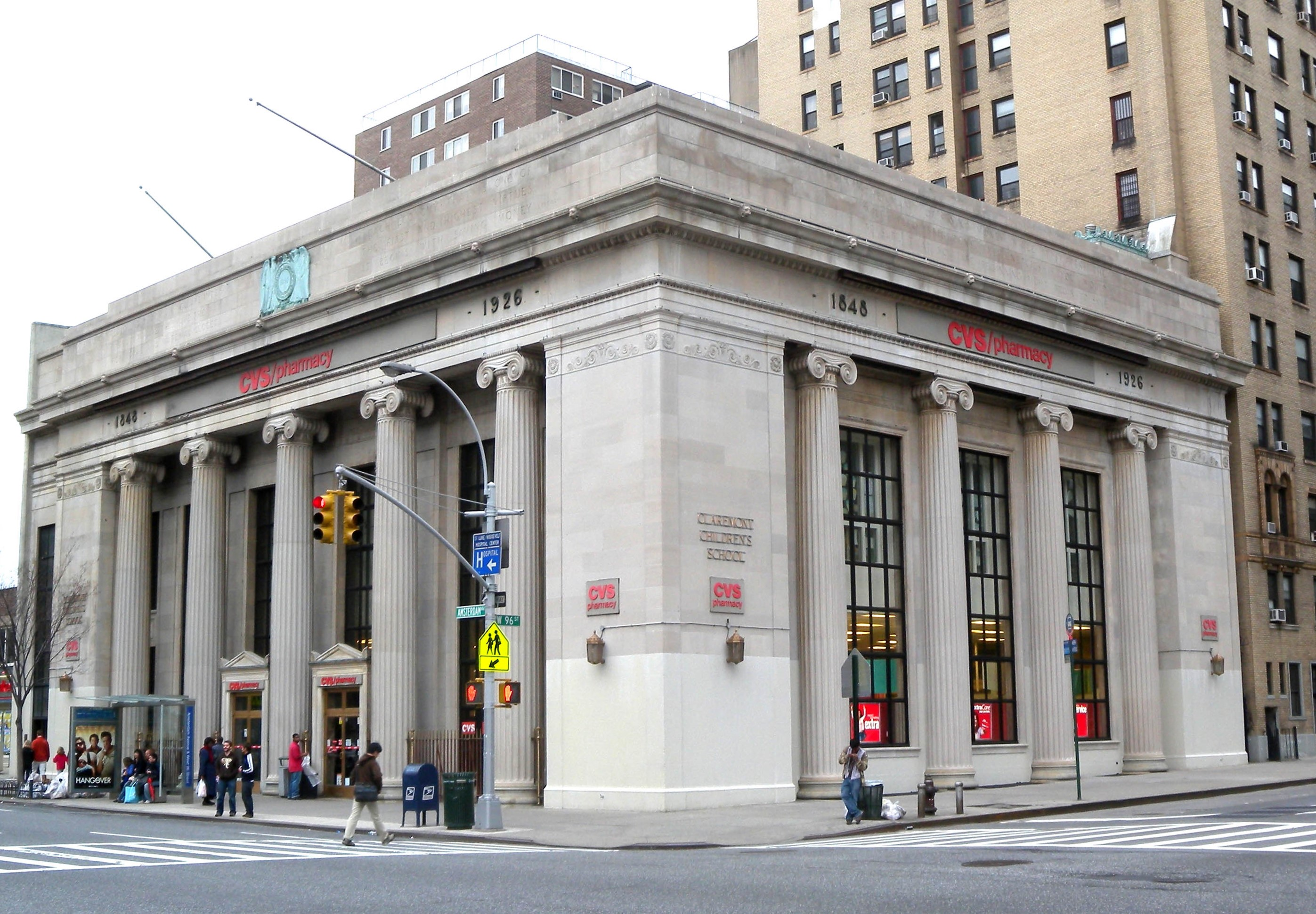
East River Savings Bank (1926-27, expanded 1931-32), Manhattan, New York

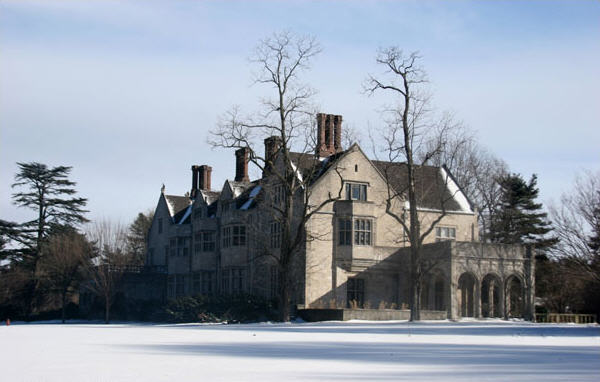
Coe Hall (1918-1920), Oyster Bay, New York

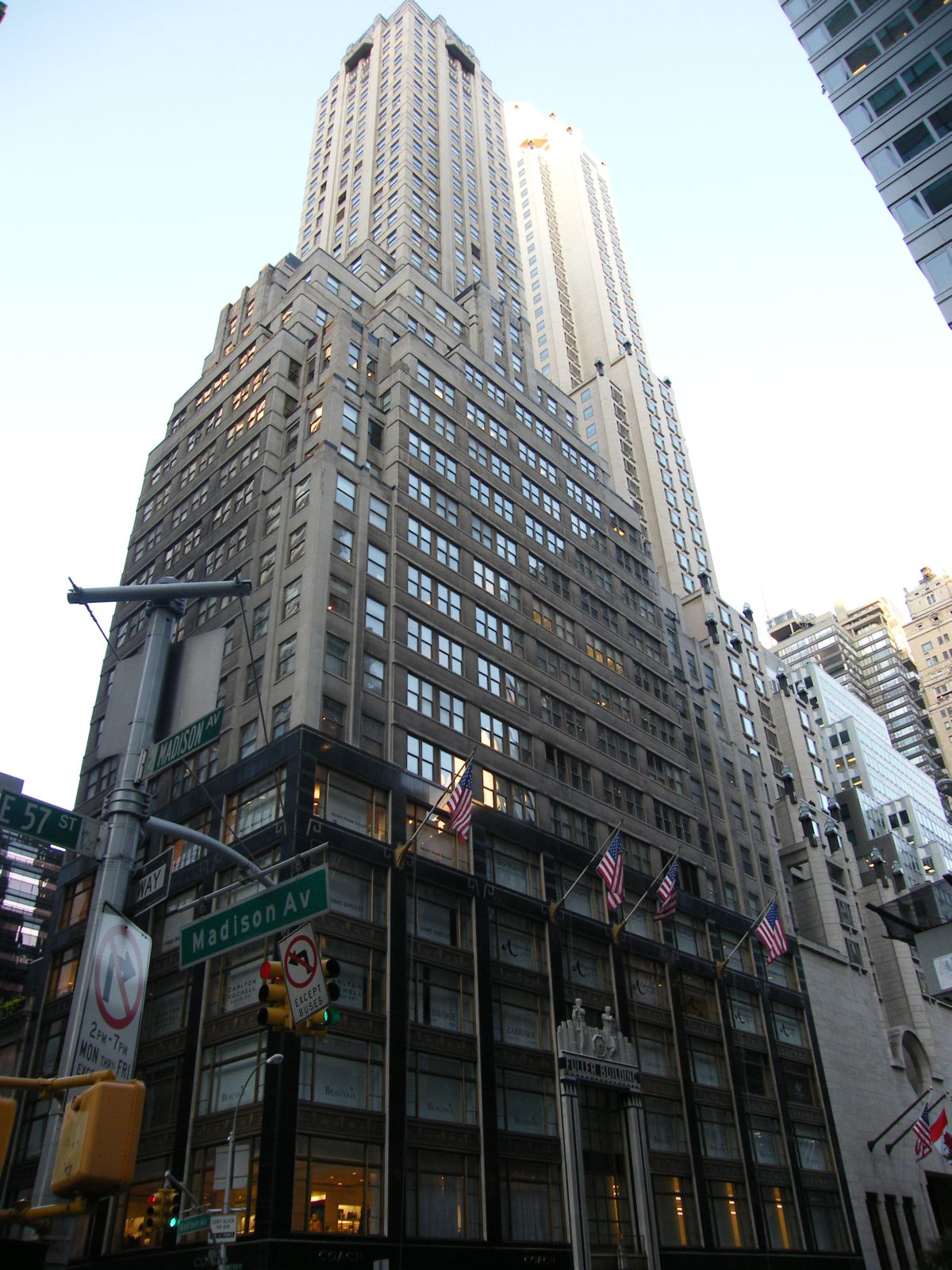
Fuller Building (1929), Manhattan, New York

Walker & Gillette was an architectural firm based in New York City, the partnership of Alexander Stewart Walker (1876–1952) and Leon Narcisse Gillette (1878–1945), active from 1906 through 1945.

== Biographies ==
Walker was a native of Jersey City, New Jersey, and graduated from Harvard University in 1898. Leon Gillette, born in Malden, Massachusetts, attended the University of Pennsylvania and worked in several New York firms, such as Howells & Stokes and Warren & Wetmore, and had also attended the École des Beaux-Arts from 1901 through 1903. The two joined forces in 1906.

Walker's wife, Sybil Kane Walker, was a decorator who worked with her husband on at least one commission. The two were married at a ceremony held at St. Mary's-in-Tuxedo Episcopal Church in 1906. Her father was Grenville Kane, banker and longtime presence in the exclusive enclave of Tuxedo Park, New York, where Walker & Gillette received important early commissions. Her sister, Edith Brevoort Kane, married the son of George Fisher Baker.

On the death of Gillette in 1945, Walker continued in business as 'Walker & Poor' with Alfred Easton Poor (the son of one of their Long Island clients). Their notable commissions include the 1950 Parke-Bernet Galleries Building in New York City. After Walker's 1952 death, that firm would eventually become known as 'Swanke Hayden Connell'.

== Company history ==
The firm was prolific and stylistically versatile. Their commissions are not clearly attributable to one partner or the other, apart from one source identifying Gillette as solely responsible for the Grasslands Hospital in East View (Valhalla), New York, several buildings in White Plains, New York, multiple buildings in the planned city of Venice, Florida, and a housing project in Lake Charles, Louisiana.

Until about 1920, most of Walker & Gillette's work amounted to two kinds of society residences: New York City townhouses, and suburban mansions. The latter as of 1915 were a step below the great Gilded Age Newport mansions of 30 years prior, but still elaborate enough to sometimes require 20 or 30 rooms, multiple outbuildings, and customized features. Their clients were bank presidents, industrialists, socialites, and railroad heirs.

Connected to the community of Tuxedo Park, New York through Walker's father-in-law, the firm designed numerous residences there, such as the 1908 Mary E. Scofield house, "Sho-Chiku-Bai", with landscape design by Takeo Shiota, as well as several additions to existing houses. Their 16 houses on Long Island were designed for clients such as Irving Brokaw, Ralph Pulitzer, Charles Lane Poor, and William R. Coe. As to the townhouses in the city, the firm is credited with some fine examples and "the last great mansion to be built in New York", the 1932 Regency-style Loew house on East 93rd.

Walker & Gillette ventured into commercial architecture in 1921 with great success. Their New York Trust Company Bank at 100 Broadway, a modest skyscraper with a colorful interior, was the first of about a dozen neo-classical branch banks in the New York area. Their 1927 National City Bank branch on Canal Street is likely the most significant. Then came a number of major skyscrapers, notably the Industrial Trust Tower in Providence, which remains the tallest building in Rhode Island, and the Fuller Building in New York, among others.

One prominent civic commission was the seamless extension, to north and south, of the New-York Historical Society building on Central Park West between 76th and 77th Streets, carried out in 1938. York and Sawyer's central block dating from 1908 was extended and sympathetically completed by pavilions on either end. This project stands among the last examples of Beaux-Arts architecture completed in the city and in the entire country. In sharp contrast the firm's most theatrical modernist building came the same year. That was the Electrical Products Building for the 1939 New York World's Fair, where an arch-headed blue slab tower intersected with a stepped curved structure.

== Notable works ==
- St. George's-by-the-River Episcopal Church, Rumson, New Jersey, for Mrs. Alice C. Strong as an English Gothic memorial to her late husband, 1907–1908. A cloister was added in 1945.
- residence at 35 East 69th Street, New York City, 1910. The current occupant, The Episcopal School, a nursery school, subsequently added two additional stories.
- manor house for the 2000-acre (8.1 km^{2}) Aknusti Estate, in Delaware County, New York, for banker and horseman Robert Livingston Gerry, Sr., with landscape design by Olmsted Brothers, 1912 (damaged by fire in 1953; now known as "Broadlands")
- Warren M. Salisbury estate, Pittsfield, Massachusetts, with murals by American realist painter Everett Shinn, circa 1914
- 35-room Bingham-Hanna House, with landscape work by the Olmsted Brothers, Cleveland, Ohio, 1916–1919, now part of the Western Reserve Historical Society
- residence at 52 East 69th Street, New York City, 1917
- Neo-Georgian Henry P. Davison House, 690 Park Avenue, 1917 (now the Italian Consulate)
- Tudor-style Coe Hall, Planting Fields Arboretum, for William Robertson Coe, 1918–1921
- Thomas W. Lamont house, 107 East 70th Street, 1921 (now the Visiting Nurse Service of New York)
- refitting of the SS Leviathan, 1922–1923
- several public buildings in the planned development of Venice, Florida in the mid-1920s, notably the Hotel Venice
- Charles E. Mitchell house, 934 Fifth Avenue, 1926. This Roman palazzo was purchased by the Free French consul in 1942, and has housed the French Consulate since 1952
- East River Savings Bank, Amsterdam Avenue and 96th Street, 1926-27, expanded 1931-32 (now shared by a CVS Pharmacy and a private preschool)
- Industrial Trust Tower, Providence, Rhode Island, still the tallest building in Rhode Island, 1927
- 13-story apartment house at 2 East 70th Street, with Rosario Candela, 1927–1928
- "Brookby", the John W. Blodgett Estate, East Grand Rapids, Michigan, 1928
- Playland amusement park, Rye, New York, 1928
- Fuller Building, 41-45 East 57th Street, 1929, with architectural sculpture over the entry by Elie Nadelman
- Caleb Bragg Estate, Montauk, New York, 1929
- Westchester County Center, White Plains, New York, 1930
- William Goadby Loew House, 56 East 93rd Street, 1931. Later occupied by the impresario Billy Rose, it was "the last great mansion" in New York City, with "the manners of John Soane". Soanian details include the three great arch-headed windows in very shallow reveals of the main floor and the windows cut out of the frieze below the cornice. Now the Spence School.
- United States Post Office, Garden City, New York, 1936
- rear-projection Trans-Lux newsreel theater, Lexington Avenue and East 52nd Street, NYC, with Thomas W. Lamb, 1938
- street-level renovations in stainless steel for the Empire Building, New York City, 1938
- Electrical Products Building, 1939 New York World's Fair (razed)
- Jacob Riis Houses public housing project, Lower East Side, 1949
- 18-story Roebling Building, 117 Liberty Street, razed for construction of the World Trade Center
- numerous commissions in Tuxedo Park, New York, including "Sho-Chiku-Bai" (1908), the Mary E. Scofield house; "Cannon Hill" (1910), the Spanish Mission style estate of Joseph Earl Stevens; the 1926 Gothic Revival style residence of banker Charles E. Mitchell, which later housed 15 English schoolchildren during WWII; the Ambrose Monell house (1910, addition), originally designed by Sturgis & Barton in 1905; "Boulder Point" (1925, addition), the T. Brownell Burham residence designed by Bruce Price in 1888; and an addition ca. 1926 to the McVicker house.
- Sandy Point Stables (commissioned by Reginald Vanderbilt), Portsmouth, RI (1902)
