= United States Post Office (Garden City, New York) =

- US Post Office-Garden City
- U.S. National Register of Historic Places
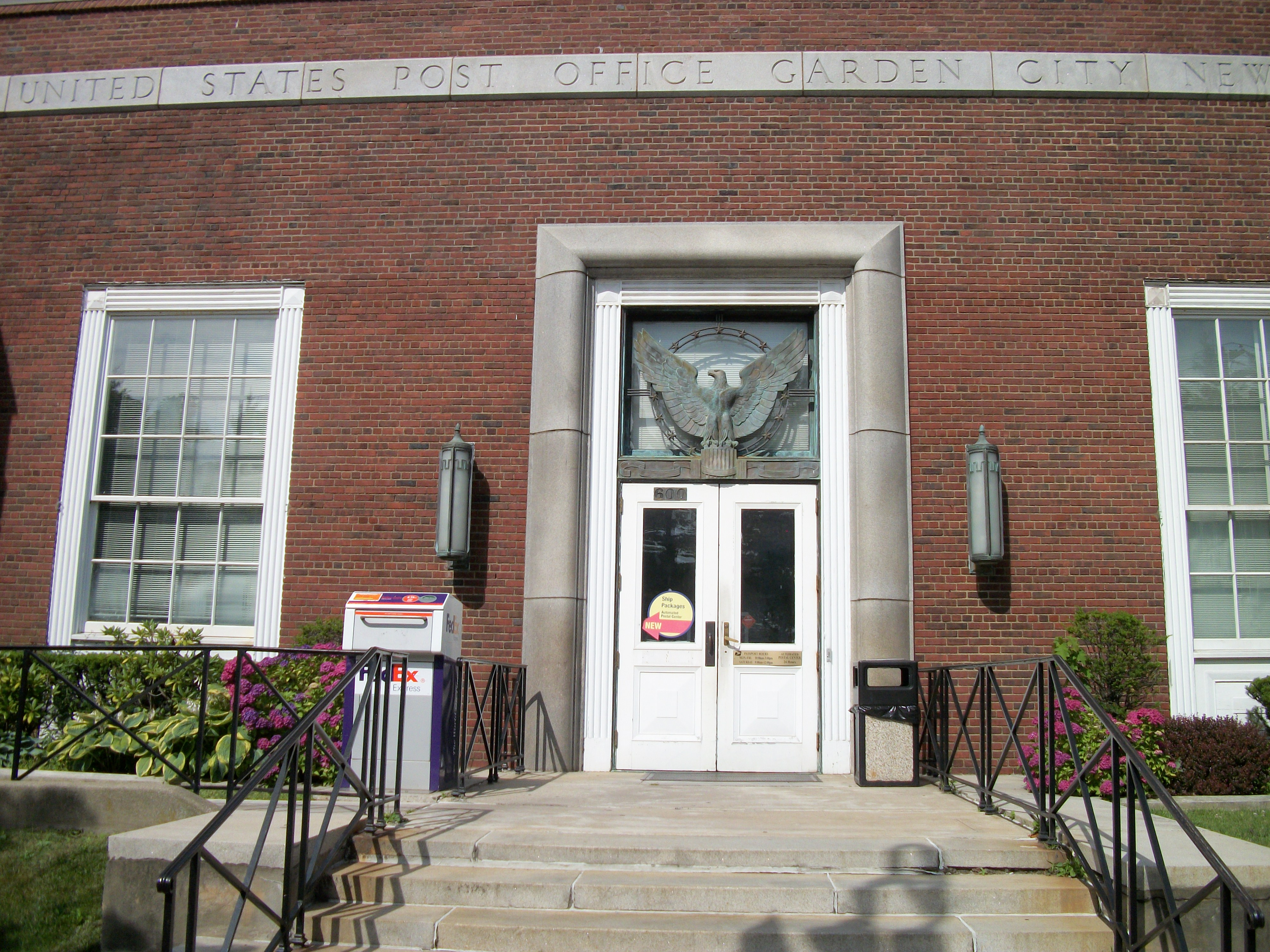
- Garden City Post Office, June 2010

- Location within New York Location within the United States
- Location: 600 Franklin Street, Garden City, New York
- Coordinates: 40°43′25.8″N 73°38′02.1″W
- Area: less than one acre
- Built: 1936
- Architect: Walker & Gillette; Perry Duncan
- Architectural style: Classical Revival
- MPS: US Post Offices in New York State, 1858-1943, TR
- NRHP reference No.: 88002521
- Added to NRHP: May 11, 1989

US Post Office-Garden City (also known as the John W. Wydler Post Office and more commonly as the Garden City Post Office) is a historic post office building located within the Incorporated Village of Garden City in the town of Hempstead, in Nassau County, New York, United States.

== Description ==
The Garden City Post Office is a one-story, square brick building on a granite in the Classical Revival style. The lobby features a 1937 mural by J. Theodore Johnson titled "Huckleberry Frolic."

== History ==
The Garden City Post Office was built in 1936 and designed by consulting architects Walker & Gillette for the Office of the Supervising Architect.

On December 24, 1987, the building was named in honor of former Congressman John W. Wydler (1924-1987).

It was listed on the National Register of Historic Places in 1989.

== Image gallery ==
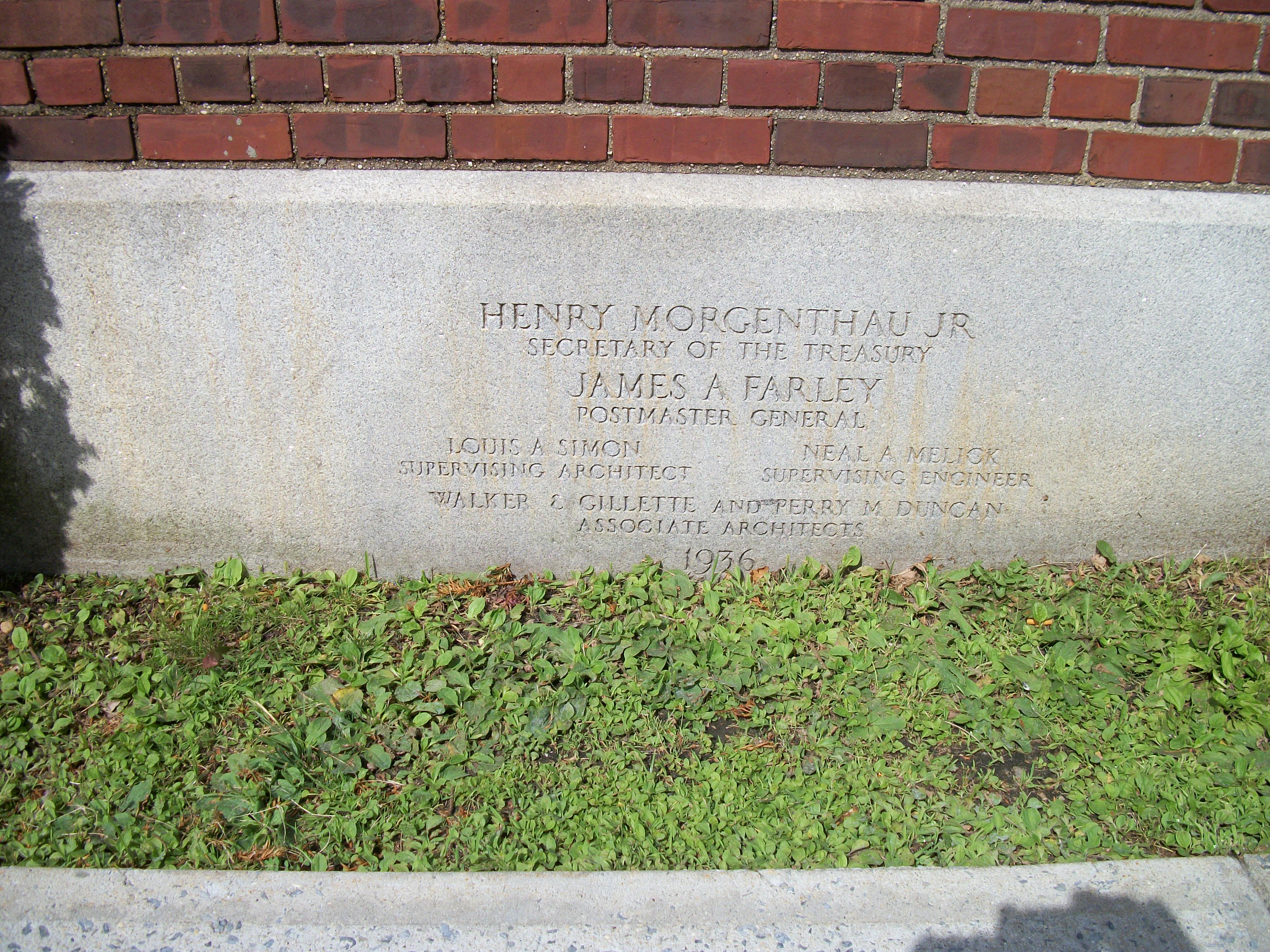
Dedicated by Henry Morgenthau Jr. and James A. Farley; 1936

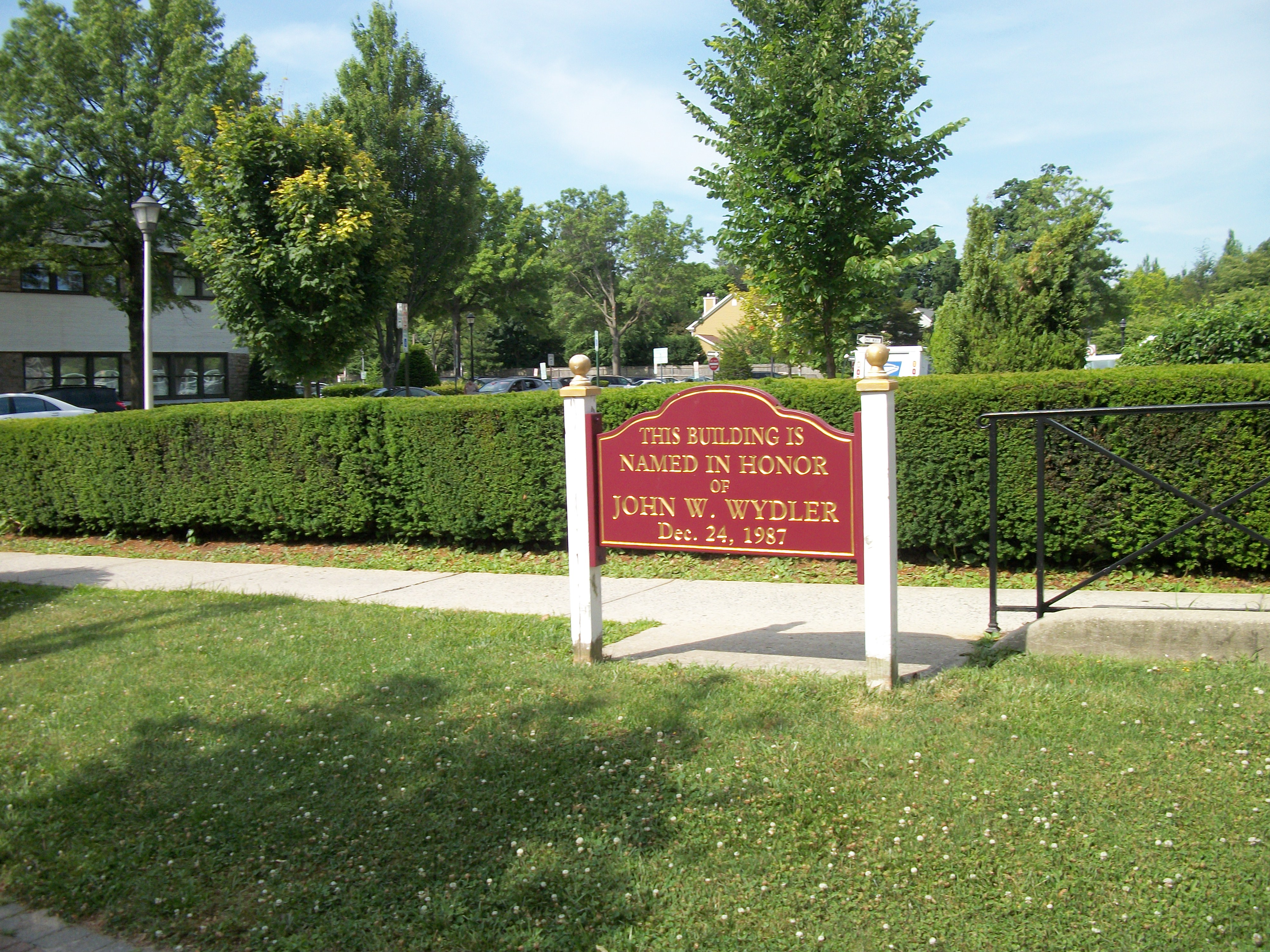
Named for John W. Wydler; 1987

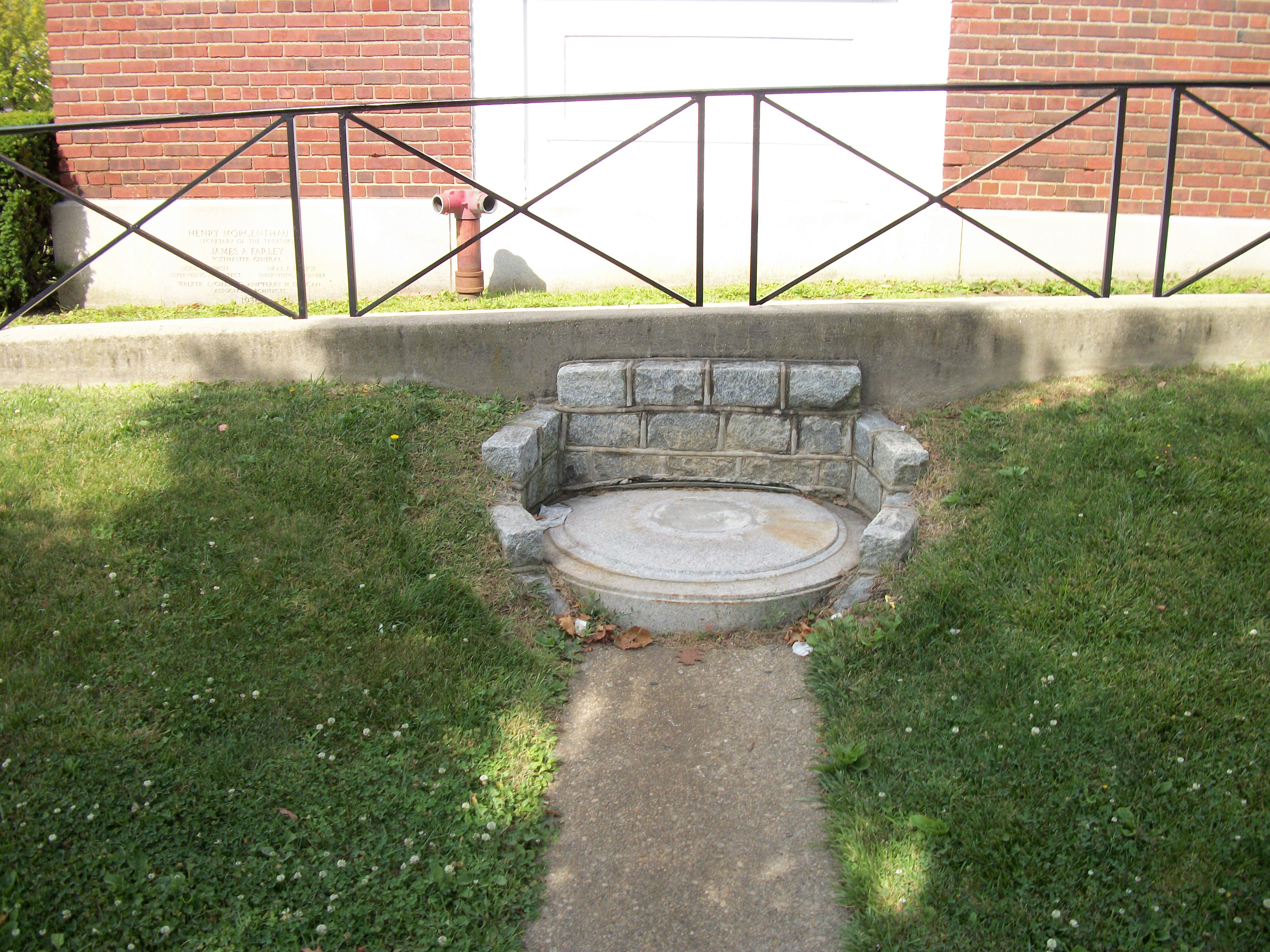
The original flagpole base

== See also ==
- A. T. Stewart Era Buildings
- United States Post Office (Hempstead, New York)
- United States Post Office (Mineola, New York)
- United States Post Office (Port Washington, New York)
