= Mrs. Graham Fair Vanderbilt House =

Historic house in Manhattan, New York

- U.S. National Register of Historic Places
- New York State Register of Historic Places
- New York City Landmark
- Mrs. Graham Fair Vanderbilt House (2026)

- Location within Manhattan Location within New York City Location within New York Location within the United States
- Location: 60 East 93rd Street, New York, New York
- Coordinates: 40°47′5″N 73°57′19″W
- Built: 1930
- Architect: John Russell Pope
- Architectural style: Classical Revival
- NRHP reference No.: 82001206
- NYSRHP No.: 06101.000678
- NYCL No.: 0436

Significant dates
- Added to NRHP: October 29, 1982
- Designated NYSRHP: September 2, 1982
- Designated NYCL: June 12, 1968

The Mrs. Graham Fair Vanderbilt House is a mansion located at 60 East 93rd Street on the Upper East Side of Manhattan in New York City. It was added to the National Register of Historic Places on October 29, 1982.

The home was built in 1930 as a residence for Virginia Fair Vanderbilt, who was a daughter of James Graham Fair and the ex-wife of William Kissam Vanderbilt II. It was designed by John Russell Pope in the Classical Revival style.

The house served as a location for the Lycée Français de New York for many years until the school completed a new building around 2003. The mansion now serves as a gallery for Carlton Hobbs LLC, an antique dealer specializing in fine European furniture and works of art.

It is located beside the William Goadby Loew House at 56 East 93rd Street.

== See also ==
- National Register of Historic Places listings in Manhattan from 59th to 110th Streets
- List of New York City Designated Landmarks in Manhattan from 59th to 110th Streets
