= Caleb Bragg Estate =

Historic house in New York, United States

- U.S. National Register of Historic Places
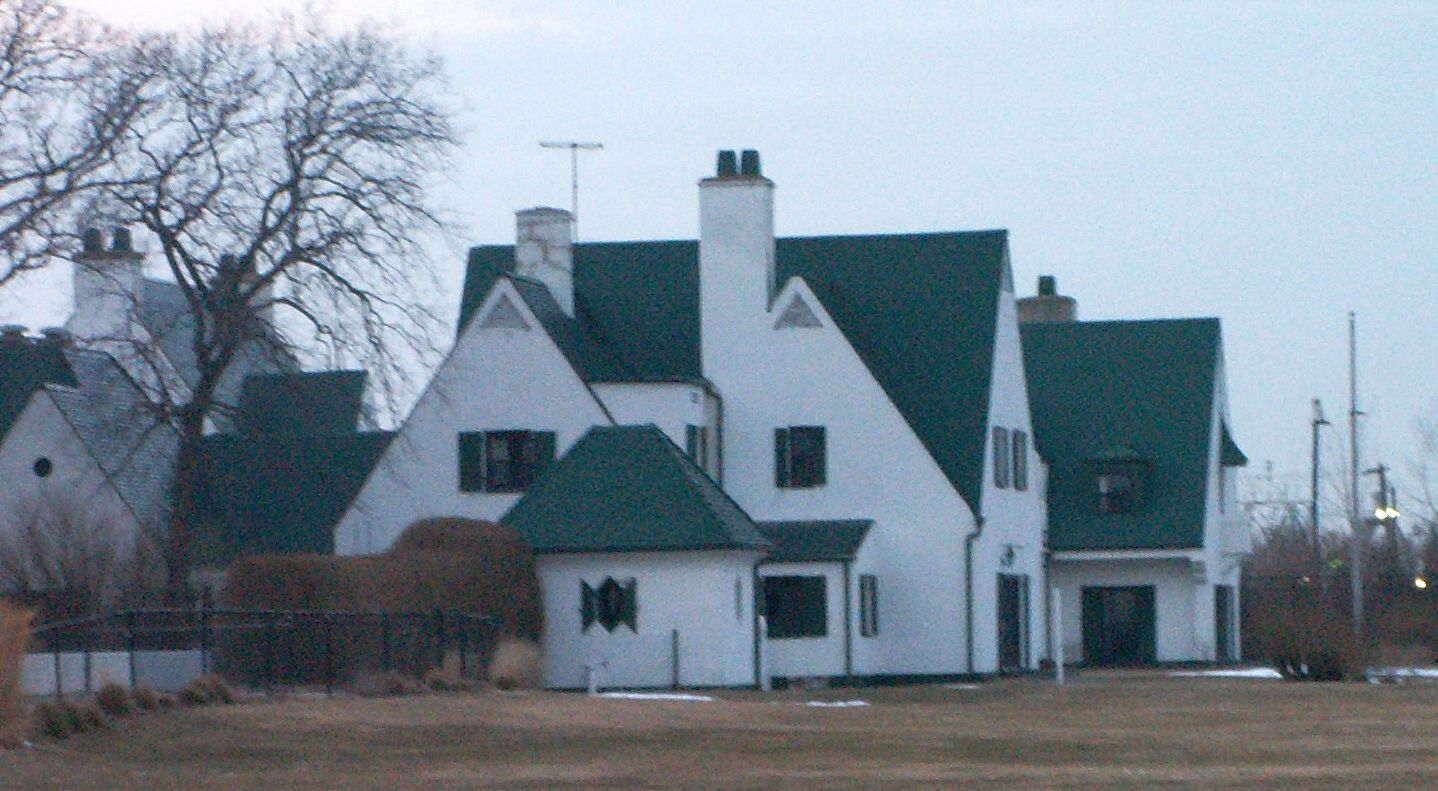
- (2009)

- Location within New York
- Location: Star Island Rd., Montauk, New York
- Coordinates: 41°4′19″N 71°56′2″W
- Area: 4.2 acres (1.7 ha)
- Built: 1929
- Architect: Walker & Gillette
- NRHP reference No.: 87001895
- Added to NRHP: November 2, 1987

The Caleb Bragg Estate, in the unincorporated village of Montauk, New York, was built in 1929. It was designed by Walker & Gillette. It was listed on the National Register of Historic Places in 1987.

In 1987, the estate included seven contributing buildings, one other contributing structure, and one contributing site.

It is a 4.2-acre (17,000 m^{2}) estate on Star Island in Lake Montauk. Walker and Gillette were the architects.

== See also ==
- Caleb Bragg
