= Fuller Building =

Office skyscraper in Manhattan, New York

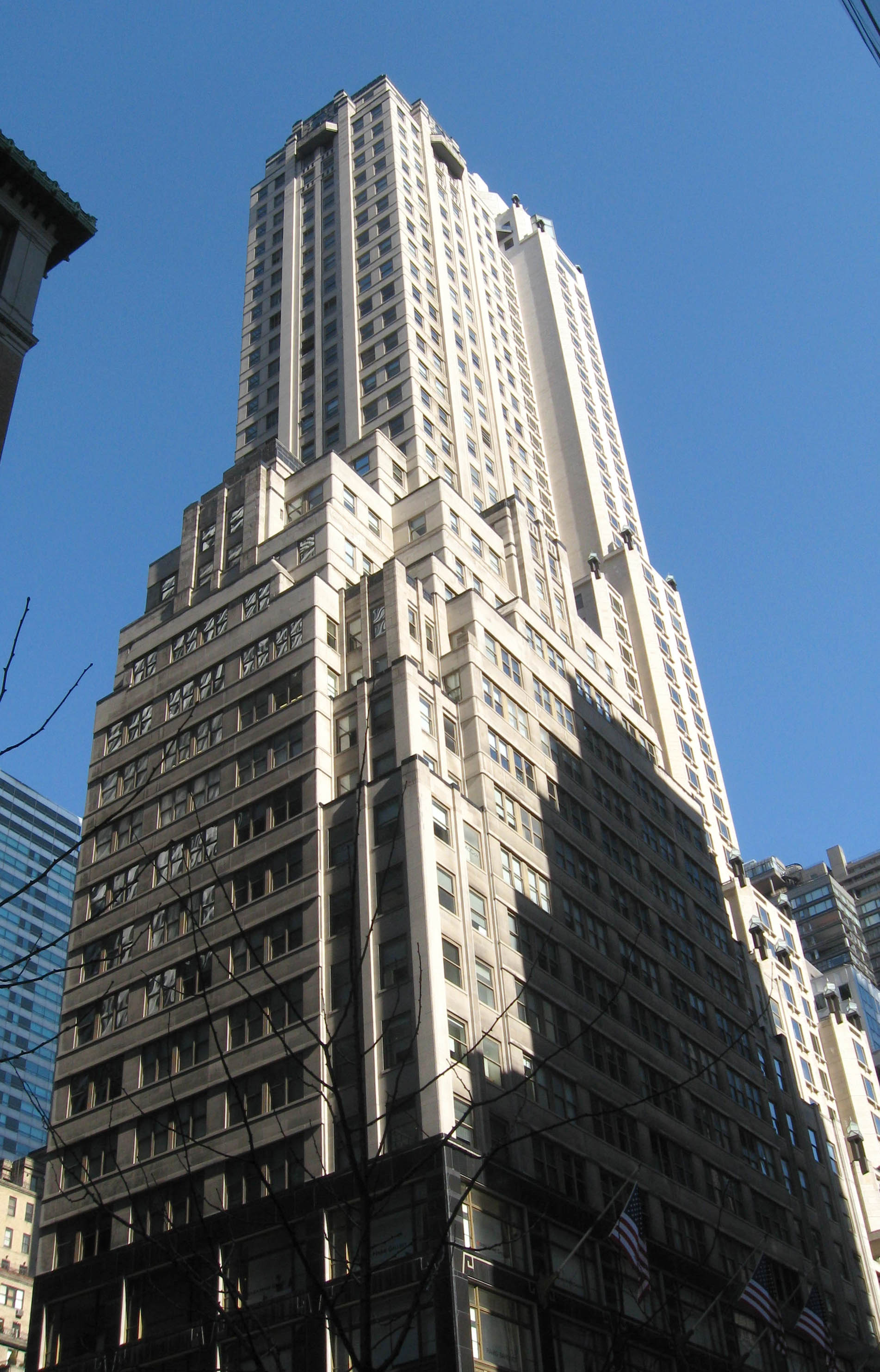
- Seen in 2009

General information
- Architectural style: Art Deco
- Location: 595 Madison Avenue, Manhattan, New York, U.S.
- Coordinates: 40°45′45″N 73°58′19″W
- Named for: George A. Fuller Company
- Construction started: 1928
- Completed: 1929

Height
- Roof: 492.13 ft (150.00 m)

Technical details
- Floor count: 40
- Lifts/elevators: 10

Design and construction
- Architect: Walker & Gillette

New York City Landmark
- Designated: March 18, 1986
- Reference no.: 1460 (exterior); 1461 (interior)

The Fuller Building is a skyscraper at 57th Street and Madison Avenue in the Midtown Manhattan neighborhood of New York City. Designed by Walker & Gillette, it was erected between 1928 and 1929. The building is named for its original main occupant, the Fuller Construction Company, which moved from the Flatiron Building.

The 40-story building is designed in the Art Deco style and contains numerous setbacks as mandated by the 1916 Zoning Resolution. The facade of the lowest six stories are clad with black granite and contain large display windows for stores, as well as large windows for art galleries. The triple-height main entrance is decorated with architectural sculpture by Elie Nadelman. The remaining stories are largely designed with light cast stone and smaller windows. The interior has richly decorated vestibules and lobby featuring marble walls, bronze detailing, and mosaic floors.

The Fuller Building was constructed as part of the artistic hub that occupied East 57th Street during the early 20th century. At the time of its completion, the Fuller Building housed several art galleries with the address 41 East 57th Street, as well as offices at the address 595 Madison Avenue. It was purchased several times over the years before being acquired in 1999 by Vornado Realty Trust, its owner as of 2026. The Fuller Building and its interior became New York City designated landmarks in 1986.

== Site ==
The Fuller Building is in the Midtown Manhattan neighborhood of New York City, on the northeast corner of Madison Avenue and 57th Street. The largely rectangular land lot covers approximately 12,900 square feet (1,200 m^{2}), with a frontage of 74.5 feet (22.7 m) on Madison Avenue and 150 feet (46 m) parallel to 57th Street. The Four Seasons Hotel New York is on the same block to the east. Other nearby buildings include 432 Park Avenue to the south; 590 Madison Avenue to the southwest; LVMH Tower and the L. P. Hollander Company Building to the west; the General Motors Building to the northwest; and the Ritz Tower to the east.

Before the Fuller Building was developed, the site was occupied by the Madison Avenue Dutch Reformed Church, constructed in 1870. In the late 19th and early 20th centuries, East 57th Street largely contained homes and structures built for the arts. The Central Presbyterian Church bought the Madison Avenue Church structure in 1915. Many of the residential structures on 57th Street were replaced with offices, shops, and art galleries by the 1920s. In April 1928, the Charles of London Corporation was planning to buy the Central Church building, with plans to redevelop the site with a 30-story skyscraper. Ultimately, the Fuller Construction Company purchased the Central Church building, and the Central Church moved to Park Avenue.

== Architecture ==
The Fuller Building was designed by Walker & Gillette in the Art Deco style, although in a very conservative fashion. The building is 492.13 feet (150.00 m) tall and contains 40 stories. The building's design contains relatively little ornament, as much of the design emphasis is on its shape, as well as the contrast of granite and stone on the facade. The Fuller Building contains numerous setbacks to comply with the 1916 Zoning Resolution, and the exterior contains various textures of stone to provide vertical and horizontal emphases on different parts of the facade. The exterior uses Rockwood stone and black Swedish granite. The interior uses gray Tennessee marble, black Belgian marble, golden veined Formosa marble, and Bottocino marble.

Christopher Gray wrote in The New York Times in 1995 that the building was "a jazz-age testament to the emerging commercial chic of 57th Street". The AIA Guide to New York City called it "the Brooks Brothers of Art Deco: black, gray and white."

=== Form ===
The six-story base occupies the entire lot, and the setbacks are largely restricted to the fifteen stories above the base. The limestone contains rounded corners at the setbacks, although these corners are generally too small to see from the street. The overall form was intended to be visualized in several vertical sections: a large base, a mass with setbacks, a narrow tower, and a crown. The base was intended for stores and galleries; the set-back midsection was for art dealers; and the narrow tower was for businesses. These differing uses were to be reflected by the differing materials used on the facade, as well as the setbacks themselves. Because of the proximity of other tall buildings, Paul Goldberger wrote for the Times in 1978 that "almost no one ever sees it" as having several vertical sections.

The outer sections of the southern elevation on 57th Street, and the southern section of the western elevation on Madison Avenue, contain setbacks on the 11th, 13th, and 15th floors, with black stone highlights at the tops of the setbacks. The eastern elevation has setbacks at the 10th, 13th, and 15th floors, which blend with the setbacks on the eastern section of the 57th Street elevation. The northern elevation contains no setbacks.

At the 16th through 21st stories on 57th Street, there are setbacks at every floor except the 18th. Along this elevation of the facade, the center two vertical bays project slightly from the 17th to 20th stories. Above the 20th story, the building rises as a continuous rectangular tower. At the 38th and 40th stories are setbacks with black stone bands. The roof of the building, above the 40th floor, also contains some setbacks for mechanical equipment.

=== Facade ===
==== Base ====
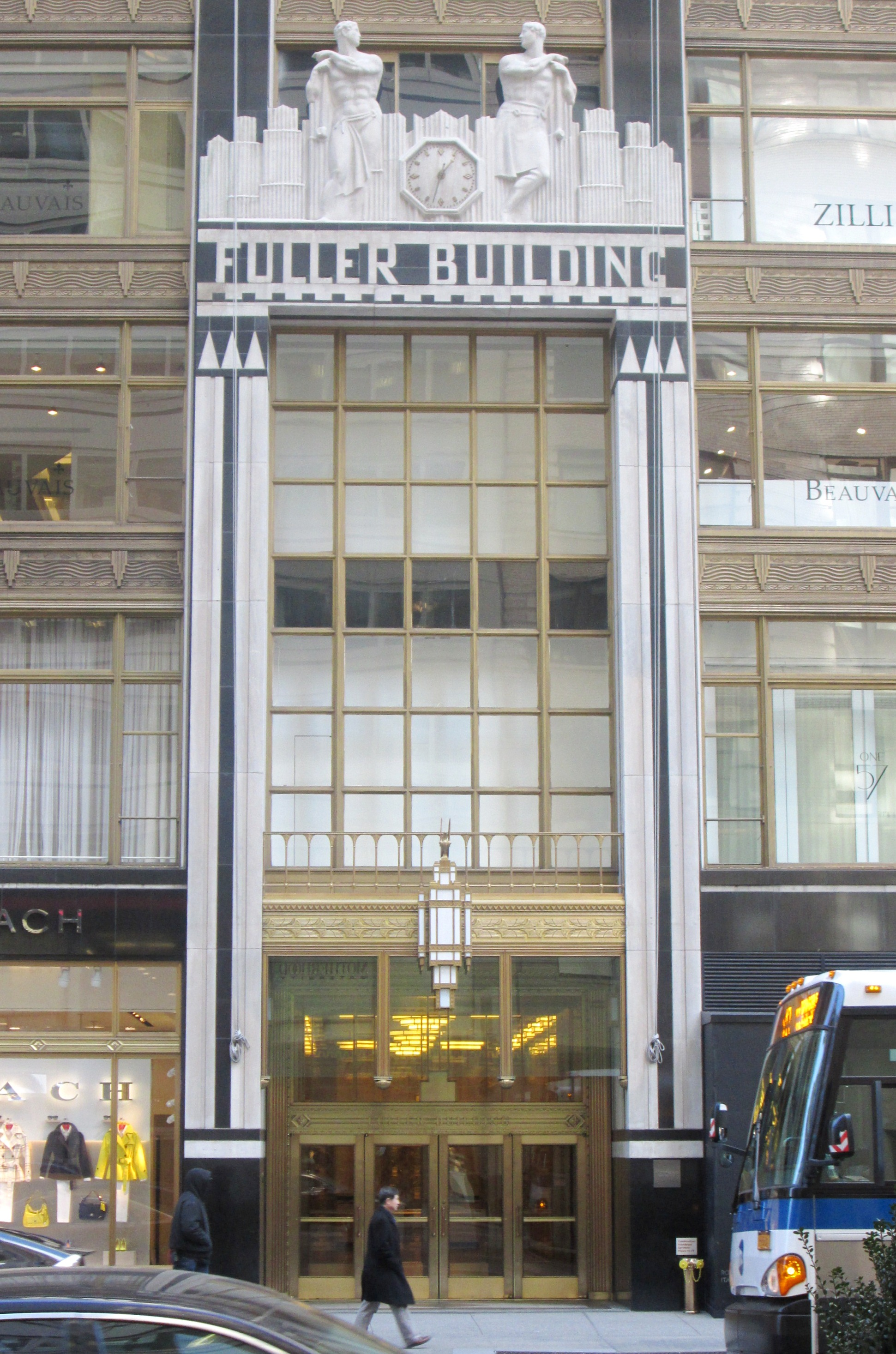
The three-story entrance on 57th Street with architectural sculptures by Elie Nadelman at the top

The lowest six stories of the Fuller Building are clad in black Swedish granite. Along the southern side, facing 57th Street, the facade consists of eight bays. The western side, on Madison Avenue, consists of four bays. There are two entrances at the base: the main entrance on 57th Street and the secondary one on Madison Avenue. In general, the Fuller Building's art galleries have tended to use the address 41 East 57th Street, while the offices have used the address 595 Madison Avenue.

The main entrance portal is in the fourth bay from west on 57th Street; it is three stories high and is flanked by granite-and-stone pilasters. There are four brass-framed glass doors at ground level, slightly recessed from the street. In front of and above the doors is a glass panel, which hangs from a bronze lintel with diamonds. At the center of the lintel is a glass-and-brass light fixture topped by an eagle. The second and third floors of the main entrance portal contain a grid of square windows framed by metal mullions. Atop the third story are stone-on-granite letters reading fuller building. Above this sign, at the fourth story, is a limestone sculptural group designed by Elie Nadelman. The sculptural group represents two construction workers flanking a clock, behind which is a carving of a skyline.

The secondary entrance is a single-story opening in the northernmost bay on Madison Avenue. The Madison Avenue entrance contains a brass service elevator door on the left and a brass-framed glass double door on the right. Atop these doors, but beneath the second story, is a sign with the stone letters fuller building. The rest of the base is designed similarly on both street facades. The ground level generally contains storefronts separated by vertical granite piers, which extend through the second to sixth floors. The second through fifth floor windows are separated horizontally by bronze spandrel panels with wave-and-inverted ziggurat designs. The fifth and sixth floors are separated horizontally by a granite band with a Greek key motif made of limestone. The window openings on each floor consist of large glass panes surrounded by smaller panes.

==== Upper stories ====
At the seventh floor, the design of the facade changes to a light-colored limestone cladding with black granite accenting. Centered above the 57th Street entrance, on the seventh through 16th floors, are five bays, each with four windows per floor, which correspond to openings at the base. Within these bays, each story is separated by horizontal bands that project slightly from the windows. Along 57th Street, the outer bays on the seventh through 16th floors consist of single-width windows with limestone piers. The center two bays on Madison Avenue have similar horizontal bands and four-window-wide bays as on 57th Street, while the outer bays contain narrower windows. On the first 17 floors, the northern and eastern facades are clad with two-tone brick and are largely unornamented. On the eastern facade, there are horizontal and vertical yellow brick bands contrasting with a darker background.

Above the 17th story, all of the facades contain single-width windows with limestone piers. Except for the northern facade, the 18th through 21st stories are clad with limestone on all sides. At the lintels above the 20th-story windows, there are black-stone geometric designs, and the piers between each bay are capped by stone slabs. The northern facade on these stories contains intermittent limestone cladding with brick.

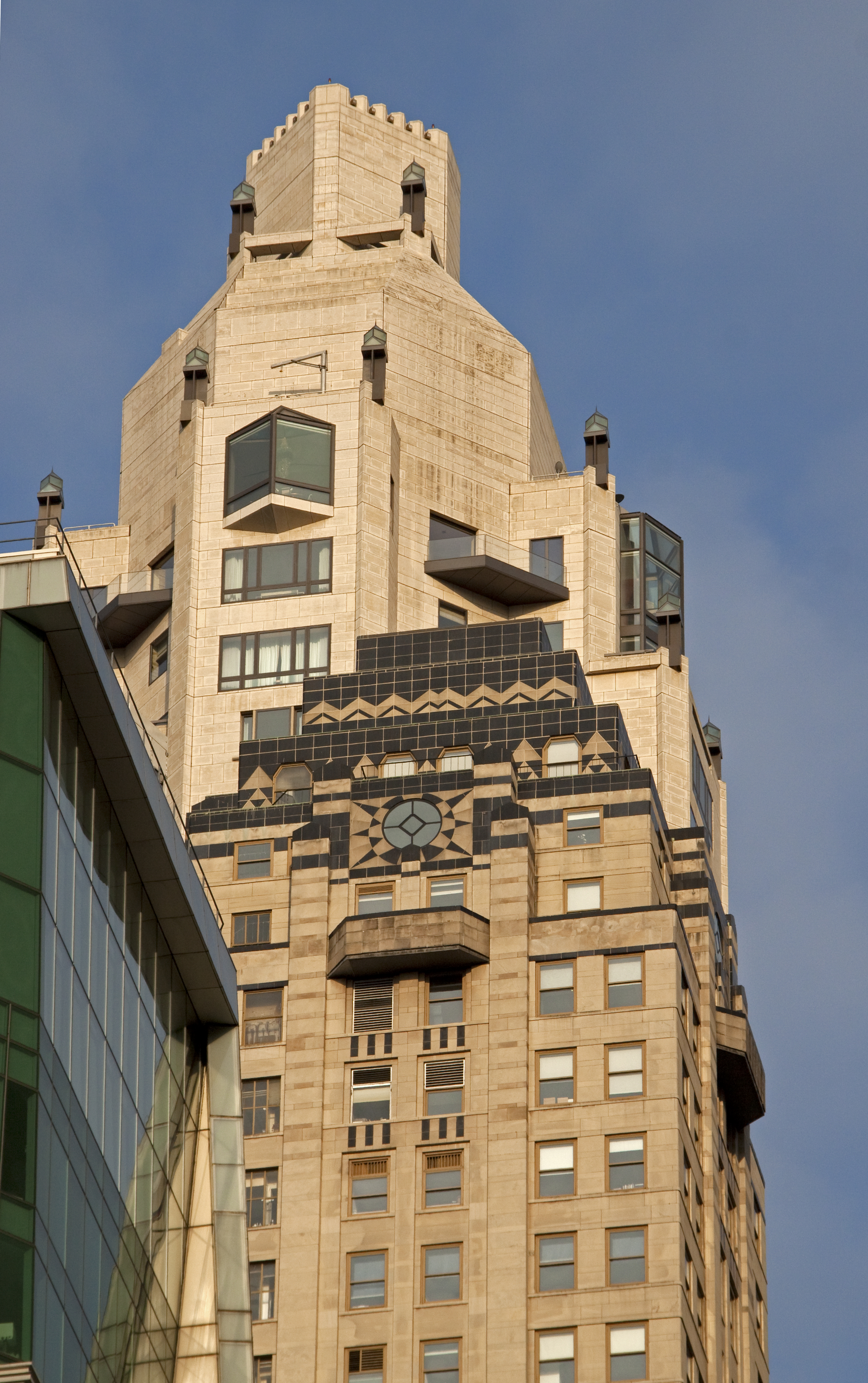
Upper story detail (center right) with the Four Seasons Hotel in the background

Above the 20th story, the west, south, and east facades are designed identically and are each six bays wide. On these facades, the two center bays are flanked by wide piers and separated by a narrow pier, with recessed spandrels separating the windows on each floor. Within the four outer bays on each facade, the windows on different stories are separated by horizontal bands. In the center bays from the 36th to 39th stories, the piers contain horizontal bands. The spandrels beneath the 36th and 37th floors contain black vertical lines, and there are balconies on the 38th floor. At the 39th floor are black-and-white sunburst motifs flanking a round window in the center bays. The roof above the 40th floor contains friezes with black-and-white triangles and zigzag patterns. The northern facade is similar but has no windows in the center two bays. Additionally, there is no balcony on the 38th floor, and the 39th and 40th floors have dark geometric patterns without any windows.

=== Features ===
The Fuller Building had a rentable area of about 210,000 square feet (20,000 m^{2}) when it was completed. According to the New York City Department of City Planning and building owner Vornado Realty Trust, the building has a gross floor area of approximately 322,000 square feet (29,900 m^{2}). The third through 19th floors typically contain an area of 7,800 to 14,700 square feet (720 to 1,370 m^{2}), while the 20th through 40th stories are much smaller, with an area of 2,000 to 4,200 square feet (190 to 390 m^{2}). Ceiling heights range from 11 to 14 feet (3.4 to 4.3 m), while the floors can carry loads of 120 pounds per square foot (590 kg/m^{2}).

The building is constructed with a steel superstructure. The steel structure contains wind bracing to minimize movement due to wind. When the Fuller Building was completed, it contained a then-novel vertical fire alarm system, with direct lines to the New York City Fire Department at every other floor, as well as tanks and standpipes throughout the height of the building.

==== Lobby ====
The lobby is T-shaped in plan, with marble, bronze, and mosaic decorations. The main entrance hall leads north from 57th Street to the elevator lobby, which leads east from the Madison Avenue entrance. Just inside either entrance are small vestibules with doors leading to the main lobby. The 57th Street vestibule's wall consists of light tan marble, with horizontal black bands on the lowest sections of the walls. One light marble panel on each wall is flanked by two narrower, darker marble pilasters, which are flush with the rest of the wall. At the top of each dark marble panel are fret designs intended to resemble the capitals of a column. The floors contain stylized mosaics inlaid with the letter "F", as well as decorative borders. The Madison Avenue vestibule is similar in design, except it has three doors to the lobby, whereas the 57th Street vestibule has four. Additionally, a stair to the basement is on the northern side of the Madison Avenue lobby.

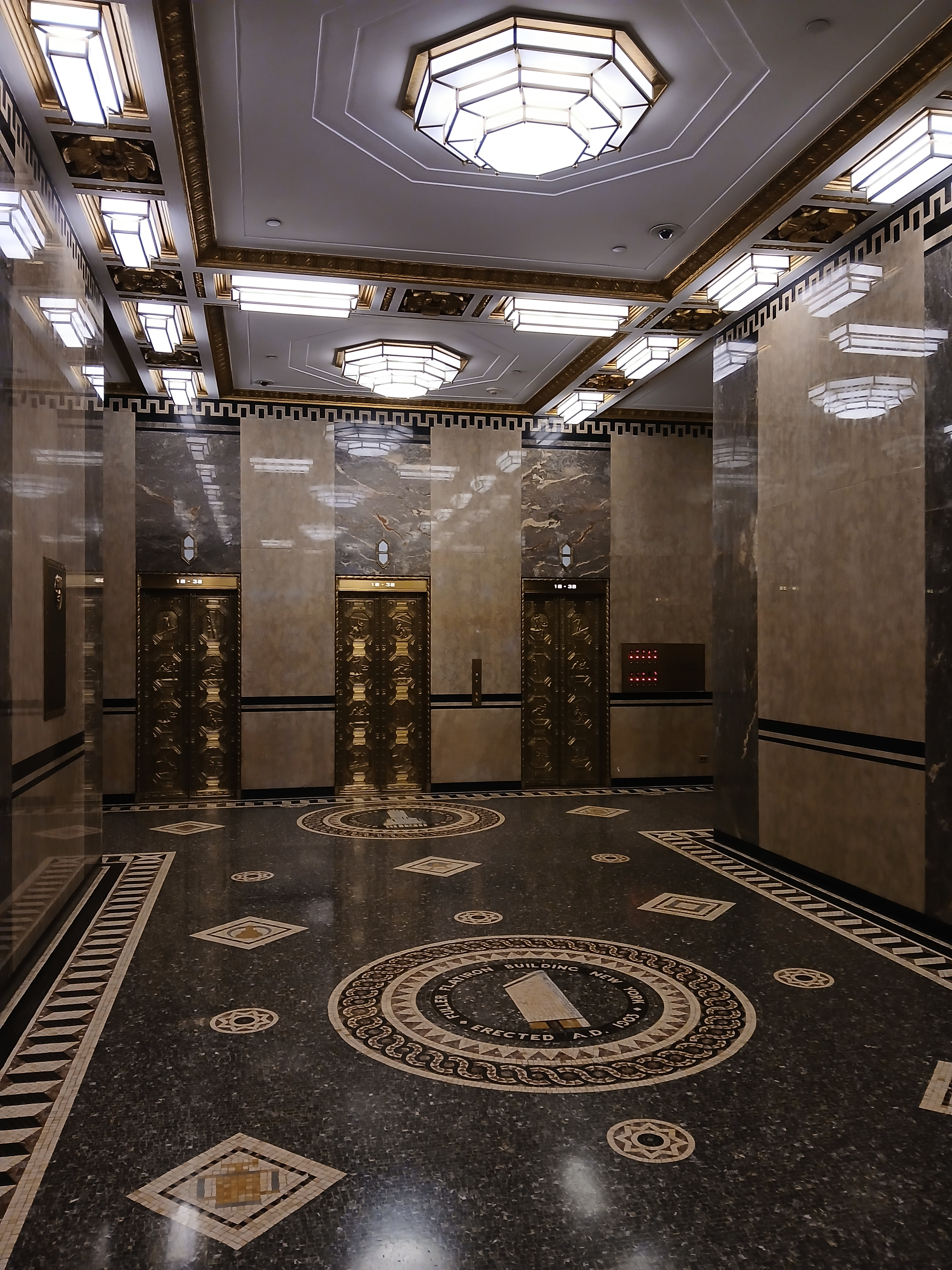
Interior of the T-shaped lobby, seen from its southern (57th Street) leg

The main lobby walls have similar designs to the vestibules, except the dark marble pilasters are placed in regular intervals along the light-tan marble surface. A black frieze with a fret pattern runs atop the entirety of all the walls. The floor of the main lobby consists of gray, black, white, and tan mosaic tiles with chevron-patterned borders and geometric patterns. The center of the floor contains three roundels depicting notable structures in the Fuller Construction Company's history: the Tacoma Building, the Flatiron Building, and the Fuller Building. These mosaics were made by Vincent Foscato in Long Island City. The ceiling is made of white plaster and contains an anthemion molding along its borders, as well as coffered ribs that divide the ceiling perpendicularly. The perpendicular ribs contain rectangular lighting fixtures, rosettes, and plain panels. The center of the ceiling contains hexagonal lighting fixtures.

The Madison Avenue hallway contains nine elevators at the intersection with the 57th Street hallway. The south wall of the lobby has three elevators: a freight elevator west of the 57th Street hallway and two passenger elevators east of the elevators. The north wall contains six passenger elevators. Each elevator contains a double-leaf bronze door with eight hexagonal bronze reliefs depicting the process of construction, as well as Art Deco-style decorative molding. There is a staircase on the far eastern end of the Madison Avenue hallway, on the south wall. In addition, the service elevator next to the Madison Avenue entrance contains a 10-by-15-foot (3.0 by 4.6 m) cab. In total, the Fuller Building has ten elevators, of which eight are for passengers and two are for freight.

==== Shops, galleries, and offices ====
The lowest six stories were reserved for shops or art galleries. The New York Times said the base was designed to provide "salon shop space", and Walker and Gillette called it "the first high-class multiple-purpose skyscraper" in the city. Tenants could occupy ground-level storefronts on 57th Street or Madison Avenue, as well as space on the second through sixth floors above their respective storefronts. Each space could be served by its own elevator and circular stair. The arrangement of vertical storefronts and the lobby's design were intended to "give the greatest attraction to the exteriors of the shops", according to Douglas Grant Scott of the United States Realty and Construction Company, the Fuller Company's parent corporation. Rents for the stores was initially calculated by averaging the rates for the first through sixth floors; in typical buildings, space on higher floors was subjected to lower rates than space on lower floors.

In the years after its opening, many galleries were opened on the storefronts in the lowest six floors. The Fuller Building became "one of Manhattan's most prestigious gallery addresses", as The New York Times described it. The gallery tenants over the years have included the Nailya Alexander Gallery, Andrew Crispo, the Charles Egan Gallery, André Emmerich, Hammer Galleries, Marlborough-Gerson, Pierre Matisse, the Katharina Rich Perlow Gallery, and the Zabriskie Gallery. Other gallery occupants have included the Kent Fine Art Gallery, Jan Krugier, David McKee, Robert Miller, the Tibor de Nagy Gallery, and Joan Washburn.

The 7th to 15th stories were designed as spaces for interior decorators and art dealers to sell merchandise. The 16th to 40th stories were designed as offices. The Fuller offices on the 16th through 19th stories were trimmed extensively in teakwood and had private elevator service. At the roof, Walker and Gillette designed an eleven-room penthouse apartment for J. H. Carpenter, president of the Fuller Construction Company at the time of the building's completion. The offices were built with cement floors, white plaster walls, and steel-and-glass partitions, while the corridors had marble and terrazzo floors.

== History ==
Architect George A. Fuller had founded the George A. Fuller Company in 1882. Unlike other architecture firms of the time, Fuller's firm intended to handle all aspects of building construction except for the design, similar to the modern general contractor. Following Fuller's death in 1900, his son-in-law Harry S. Black took over as president of the Fuller Company and made it a subsidiary of the new United States Realty and Construction Company. Shortly after Fuller's death, Black constructed what is now the Flatiron Building at Fifth Avenue and 23rd Street for the company's headquarters. That structure was supposed to be called the "Fuller Building" in honor of the late Fuller, but its triangular flatiron shape led to the popular name "Flatiron Building" instead. By the 1920s, the center of business in Manhattan had moved northward to Midtown.

=== Development ===
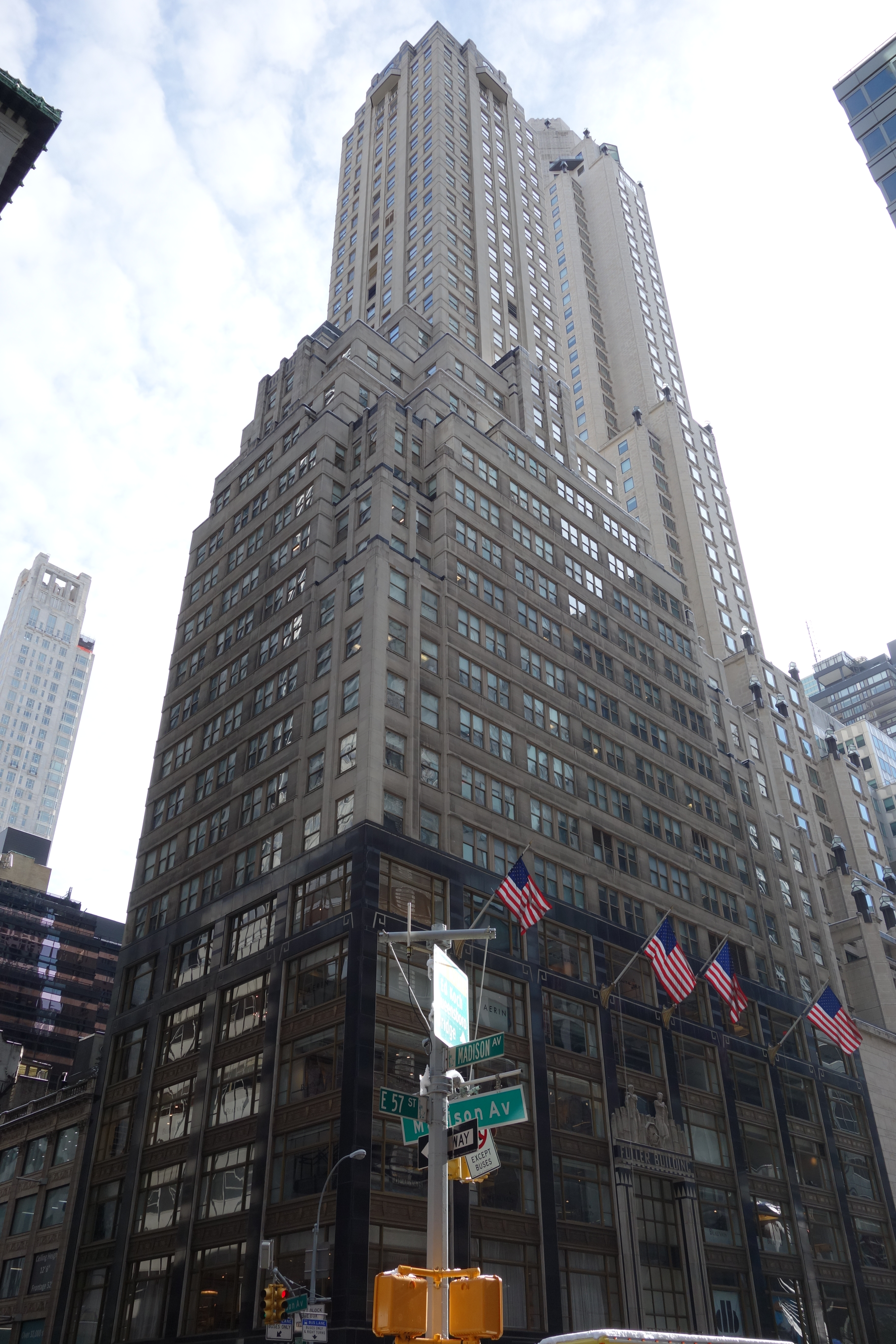
Viewed from across Madison Avenue and 57th Street

In May 1928, the Fuller Company purchased the Central Church at Madison Avenue and 57th Street for $3 million. The United States Realty and Construction Company founded a subsidiary, the GAF Realty Company, to construct a 30-story building on the site. The board of GAR Realty consisted of officers from the National City Bank of New York and the Fuller Company, which were to occupy the building. Walker and Gillette were hired to draw the plans. The plans were revised to 39 stories by September 1929, when the official blueprints were filed with the Manhattan Bureau of Buildings.

To fund the construction, United States Realty sold $5 million in bonds and $3 million in debentures in January 1929. The Fuller Company planned to name the new structure "Fuller Building", transferring the name from the Flatiron Building. The Fuller Company labeled both entrances of its new building prominently, likely in an attempt to prevent the structure from being mislabeled like its predecessor had been. In June 1929, twenty-four mechanics received craftsmanship awards for their work on the Fuller Building. The building was completed on September 7, 1929. Two days later, the Fuller Company moved its offices to the 16th through 19th floors of the building, becoming its first tenant.

=== 1930s to 1980s ===
In the building's first two decades, its commercial tenants included Kaskel and Kaskel, a haberdasher that moved to the corner storefront in the Fuller Building. as well as McGibbon & Co., one of the city's oldest linen merchants. Storefront and basement space was also leased to Sally Gowns Inc. and McGibben & Co., both clothing companies, and Edward Garratt Inc., furniture dealer. Galleries moved to the building as well, including the F. Kleinberger Galleries, the Pierre Matisse Gallery, the French Art Galleries, and manuscript and autograph dealer Thomas F. Madigan Inc. The office story tenants included the French Consul, food processor Standard Brands, book publisher Jordanoff Aviation Corporation, developer Paul Tishman, financier Frederick Lewisohn, former New York governor Herbert H. Lehman, and businessman Bernard Baruch. A committee was formed in 1935 to protect the interests of the building's bondholders.

The Penroy Realty Company. led by Miami-based realtor Kenneth S. Keyes, bought the building on behalf of "out-of-town" investors in January 1949. At the time, the Fuller Construction Company still maintained its executive offices there. Shortly afterward, the building received a $3 million first mortgage from Massachusetts Mutual Life Insurance. In January 1961, investor Lawrence Wien purchased the building's 33-year lease from the Fuller Building Corporation, with two options for 25-year renewals. Four months later, a syndicate headed by Irving Brodsky and Richard Gittlin bought a 99-year leasehold for the land from the Fuller Building Corporation. Leases on 100,000 square feet (9,300 m^{2}), about half of the office space, were set to expire in 1962, and it was renting at a rate below the average for the neighborhood. As a result, the owners decided to renovate the building's mechanical features such as acoustical ceilings, fluorescent lighting, and air conditioning. Simultaneously, new or existing tenants signed leases for the remaining office space. In 1968, Brodsky signed a contract to purchase the Fuller Building on behalf of the Fred F. French Company, which paid cash to cover the $4.2 million mortgage.

By the late 20th century, the Fuller Building had become a center for art galleries. Not only was 57th Street still an artistic hub, but also, building management was willing to accommodate each gallery's specific needs, such as large doorways, minimal window space, and heavy floor slabs. Accordingly, by the 1970s, much of the showroom space on the lowest six floors was used mostly by galleries. The building's retail space also remained popular despite being split across multiple levels. As Carter B. Horsley wrote for The New York Times in 1978, the building was one of the few in the city "that have been successful in maintaining more than two retail floors", aside from specialty buildings. The Fuller Company continued to occupy the building until the early 1980s. The New York City Landmarks Preservation Commission designated the exterior and lobby interior as city landmarks in 1986.

=== 1990s to present ===
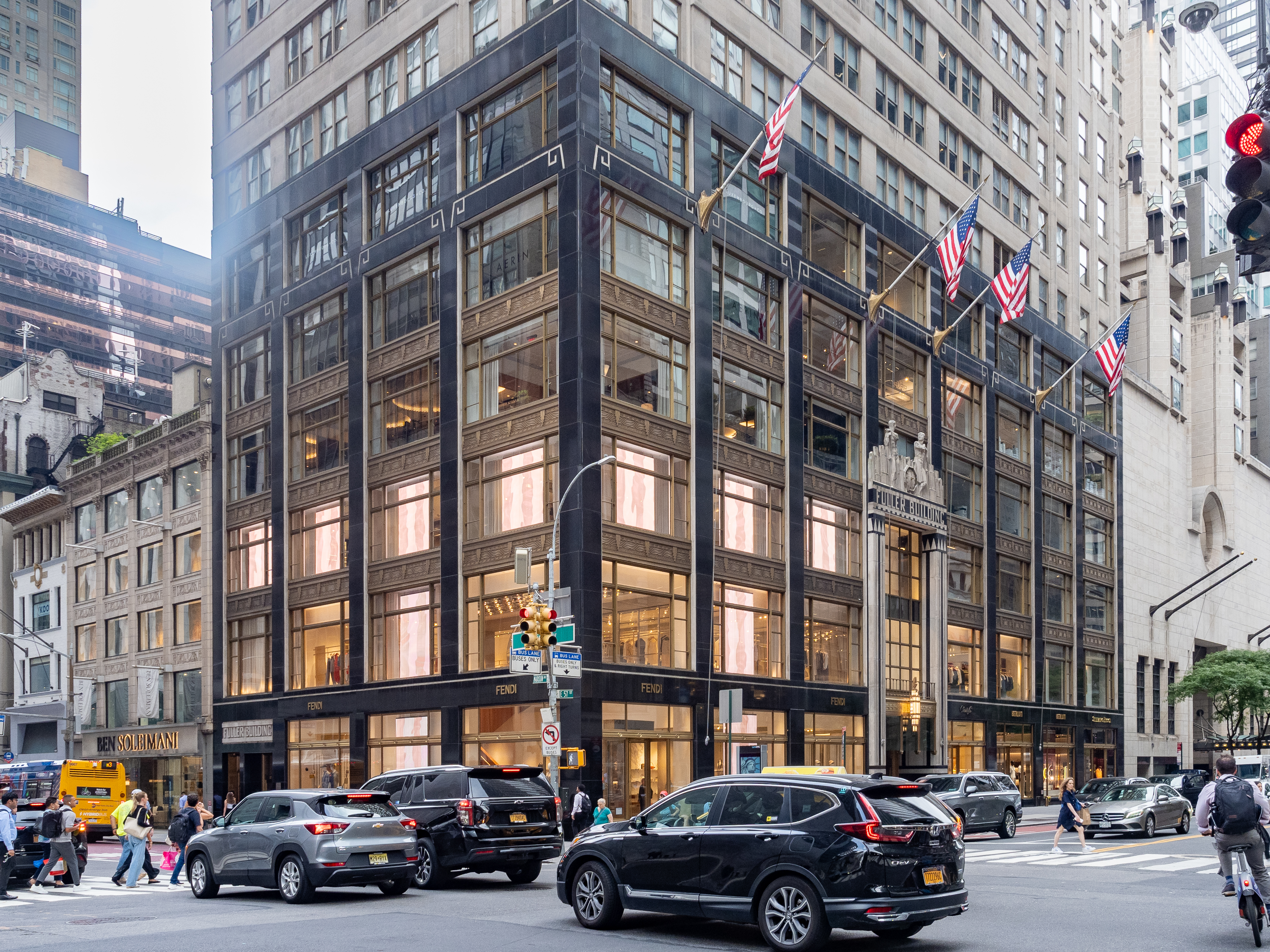
Base as seen from across Madison Avenue and 57th Street

Cushman & Wakefield took over management of the building in 1990. While the Fuller Building contained over twenty art galleries at the time, several gallery tenants expressed frustration that rents at the building were much higher compared to other buildings. By the beginning of 1994, the Fuller Building was more than 25 percent vacant. Within the same year, the office space remained vacant but much of the available gallery space was occupied. The mortgage holder L&B Group retook the building in December 1994 and subsequently started renovating the building. The changes included replacement windows, a facade cleaning, and upgrading the interior to modern standards. By then, the Fuller Building had been overshadowed by the construction of the much taller Four Seasons Hotel on the adjacent lot, which had been completed in 1993.

In August 1999, Vornado Realty Trust arranged to purchase the Fuller Building for approximately $125 million; the next month, the company closed on its purchase. Vornado announced in 2002 that it planned to renovate the base to designs by Skidmore, Owings & Merrill, though this plan received some opposition. The proposal called for replacing the glass above the main entrance with "electronic glass", which could alternate between being transparent or opaque, as well as adding similar glass above the lobby ceiling. Coach Inc. opened its global flagship store in the building in 2005. Coach abruptly closed its store in January 2020. A Berluti flagship opened in part of the former Coach space in December 2020, and a two-level Fendi flagship store opened in another part of Coach's space in July 2021. By the end of 2021, the building was 81 percent occupied, and its tenants included fashion firms such as Bottega Veneta and Tom Ford.

== See also ==
- Art Deco architecture of New York City
- List of New York City Designated Landmarks in Manhattan from 14th to 59th Streets
