= George Baker (dean of Antigua) =

George Stanley Baker was the Dean of Antigua from 1943 until 1970.

Baker was educated at Codrington College and ordained in 1926. His first post was a curacy at St. John's Cathedral Antigua, after which he held incumbencies in Anguilla and St Kitts. He then served the rest of his career at the Cathedral: from 1937 until 1943 as Sub Dean and from then until retirement as Dean.
