= George P. Baker (Herman C. Krannert Professor) =

American economist

George Pierce Baker III previously served as the Herman C. Krannert Professor of Business Administration at Harvard Business School.

He coauthored with George David Smith The New Financial Capitalists: Kohlberg Kravis Roberts and the Creation of Corporate Value.

He graduated from Harvard College and Harvard Business School.
