= Kenneth Baker Schley =

American aviator (1917–2001)

Kenneth Baker Schley Jr. (November 13, 1917 – September 21, 2001) was an American aviator.

Born in New York City, Schley graduated from St. Paul's School in Concord, New Hampshire in 1937 and from Princeton University in 1941.

As an Army lieutenant in World War II at the Battle of the Bulge, he famously risked his live on Christmas Eve 1944 to fly penicillin into the beleaguered town of Bastogne and was awarded the Silver Star.

He was a limited partner in Moore and Schley, the company founded by his father. He owned the Far Hills Land Corp. which is an extensive condominium site in New Jersey.

A resident of Far Hills, New Jersey, Schley died at the age of 83 at Morristown Memorial Hospital.
