= George Baker (cricketer, born 1849) =

English cricketer

Personal information
- Full name: George Dashwood Baker
- Born: 4 March 1849; Compton Martin, Somerset, England
- Died: 21 December 1879 (aged 30); Ayot St Lawrence, Hertfordshire, England
- Batting: Right-handed
- Bowling: Right-arm fast

Domestic team information
- Years: Team
- 1872: Middlesex

Career statistics
Competition	First-class
Matches	1
Runs scored	5
Batting average	2.50
100s/50s	–/–
Top score	5
Balls bowled	–
Wickets	–
Bowling average	–
5 wickets in innings	–
10 wickets in match	–
Best bowling	–
Catches/stumpings	2/–
- Source: Cricinfo, 23 January 2013

George Dashwood Baker (4 March 1849 – 21 December 1879) was an English cricketer. Baker was a right-handed batsman who bowled right-arm fast. He was born at Compton Martin, Somerset.

Educated at Rugby School before attending University College, Oxford, Baker later made a single first-class appearance for Middlesex against Oxford University in 1872 at the Prince's Cricket Ground, Chelsea. In Middlesex's first-innings of 250, Baker was dismissed for 5 runs by Samuel Butler, while in their second-innings of 277 he was dismissed by Arthur Ridley. His only first-class appearance ended in a draw.

He died at Ayot St Lawrence, Hertfordshire on 21 December 1879.
