= William Goadby Loew =

American stockbroker

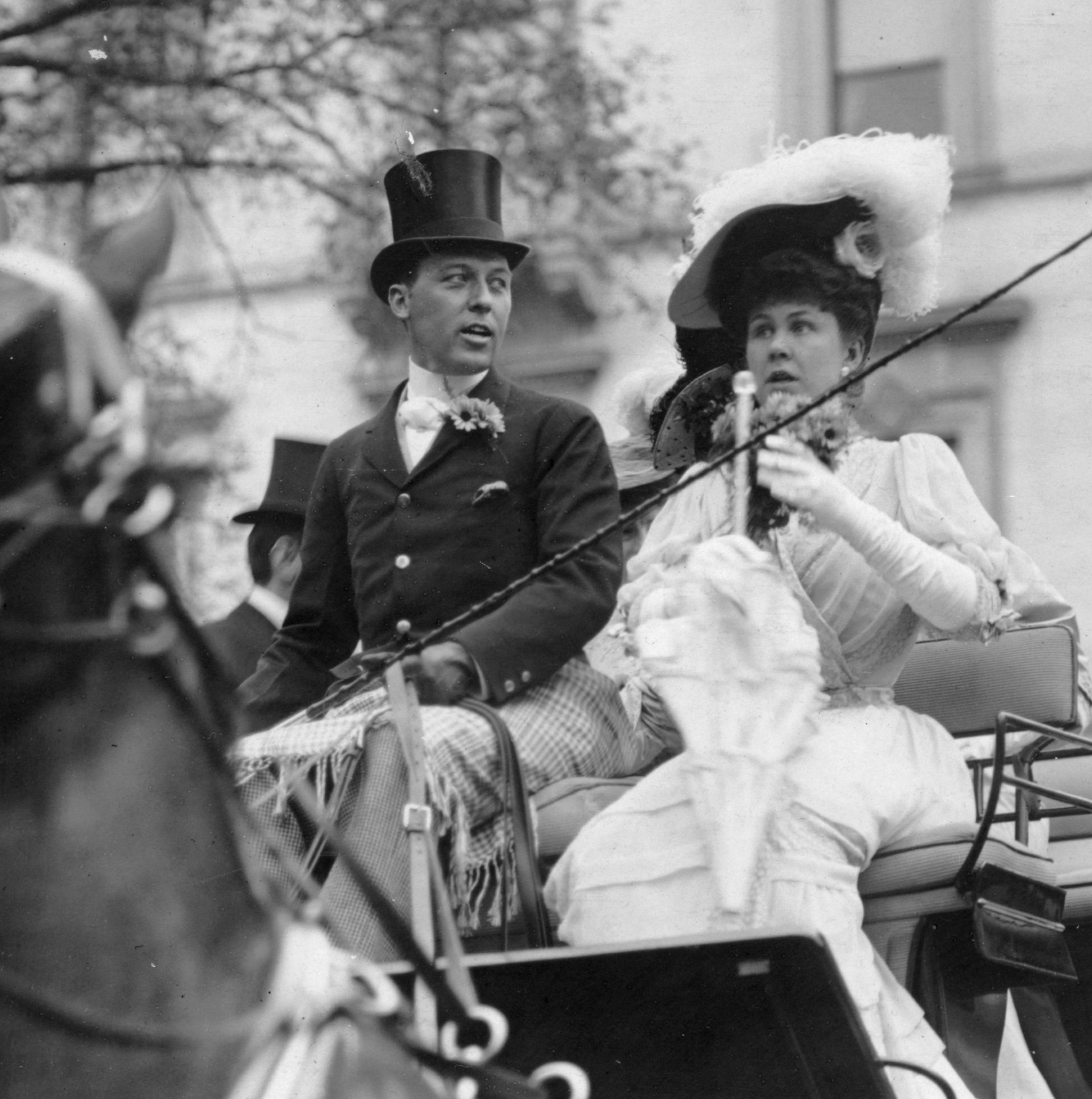
- William and Florence Loew riding in an open carriage, 1906
- Born: November 3, 1875
- Died: May 23, 1955 (aged 79); New York City, U.S.
- Education: Columbia College
- Occupations: Stockbroker; financier
- Spouse: Florence Bellows Baker (m. 1898)
- Children: 4
- Parent(s): Edward Victor Loew; Julia Frances Goadby

William Goadby Loew (November 3, 1875 – May 23, 1955) was a Manhattan stockbroker and financier.

== Early life ==
Loew was born on November 3, 1875. He was a son of Julia Frances (née Goadby) Loew and Edward Victor Loew, a lawyer who served as New York City Comptroller. His elder brother, also named Edward Victor Loew, married Catherine Cossitt Dodge, and served in Squadron A of the New York Volunteer Cavalry with their uncle, Arthur M. Goadby, during the Spanish-American War.

His paternal grandparents were Frederick J. Loew and Salome (née Schaffner) Loew, both natives of Strasbourg, Germany. His uncle was Frederick William Loew, the twelfth Judge of the Court of Common Pleas (who married Julia Augusta Vanderpoel, daughter of Dock Commissioner Jacob Vanderpoel). His maternal grandparents were Thomas Goadby and Julia (née Stacey) Goadby of Manhattan.

Loew graduated from Columbia College in 1897.

== Career ==
The same year he graduated from Columbia, he bought a seat on the New York Stock Exchange in 1897 which he retained until his death in 1955.

In 1915, he founded Loew & Co., which maintained offices at 2 Wall Street until it was acquired by W. H. Goadby & Co. in 1938, of which Loew became a special partner, although he later relinquished the connection.

=== Thoroughbred horse racing ===
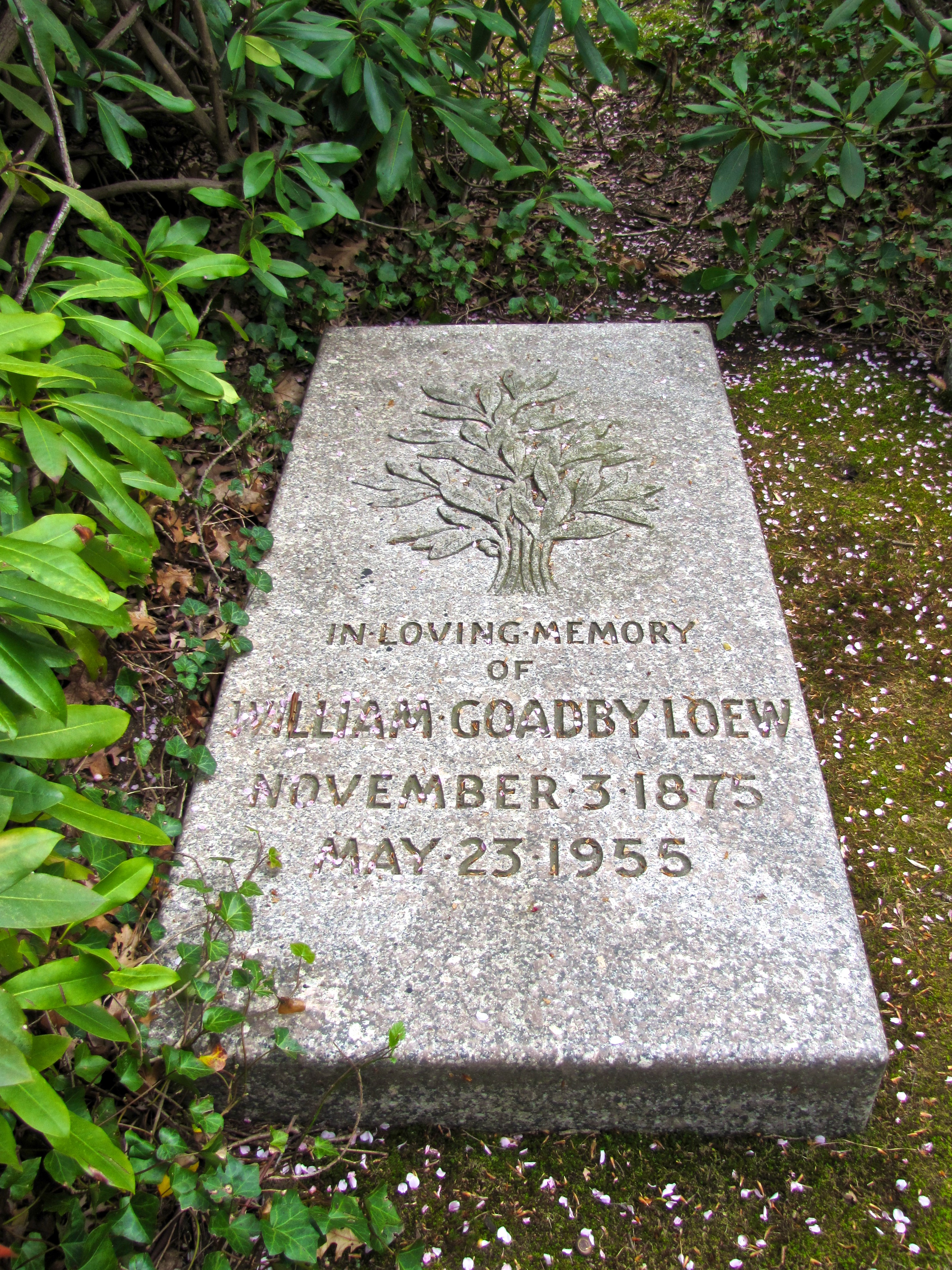
William Goadby Loew's grave, Locust Valley, NY (2011)

Loew was a fan of horse racing and an owner of Thoroughbred runners. His successful horses included Helioptic who won the 1946 Queens County Handicap, and the multiple stakes race winning filly Case Goods whose wins included the 1953 Astoria Stakes.

== Personal life ==
On April 12, 1898, Loew was married to Florence Bellows Baker, the daughter of George Fisher Baker, at All Souls' Unitarian Church in New York City. In 1934, he was picked as one of the best-dressed men in the United States. Together, they were the parents of four daughters:

- Barbara Baker Loew (1899–1961), who married Edwin Main Post Jr., son of Emily Post, in 1920. They divorced in 1934 and she married Nicholas Ivanovich Holmsen in 1935.
- Florence Julia Loew (1901–1972), who married Robert Early Strawbridge Jr., a grandson of Charles Frederick Berwind, in 1931.
- Evelyn Loew (1903–1969), who married Edward Livingston Burrill (1896–1981) in 1923. They divorced and she married Crawford Hill Jr., a son of Crawford Hill, in 1936.
- Winifred Loew (1909–1982), who married Richard Trimble (1904–1941). After his death, she married John Parkinson (1906–1973) in 1947.

His wife died on May 24, 1936, at 56 East 93rd Street, their townhouse in New York City. Loew died of a heart attack at the Racquet and Tennis Club in New York City on May 23, 1955. He is buried with his wife at Locust Valley Cemetery in Locust Valley.

=== Residences and collections ===
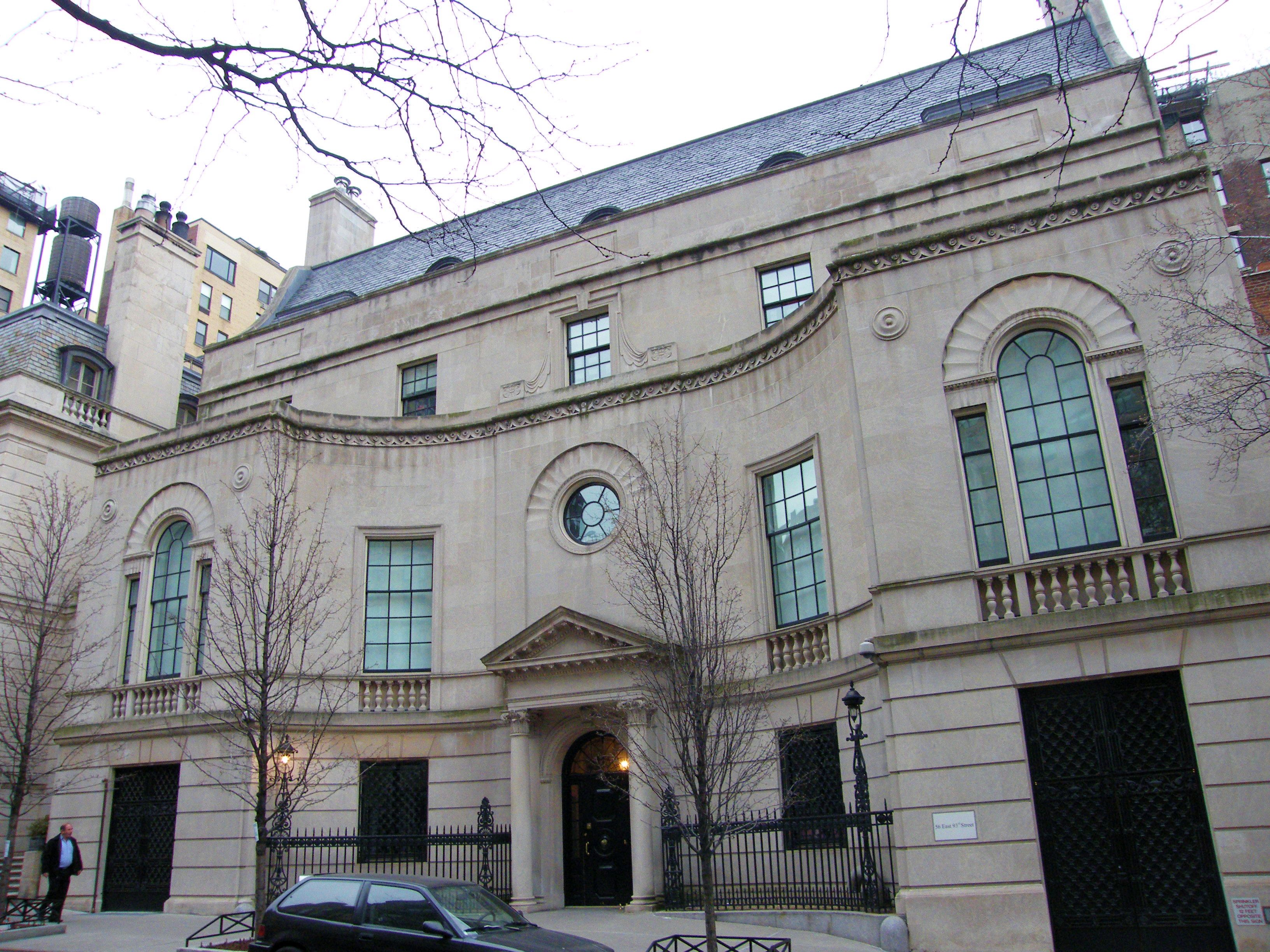
The William Goadby Loew House, New York City

In addition to their New York City townhouse at 56 East 93rd Street, they owned Stoneacre, a large villa along Bellevue Avenue in Newport, Rhode Island (the grounds were designed by Frederick Law Olmsted), and Loewmoor in Old Westbury, New York (originally the Charles Albert Stevens estate named Annondale, and subsequently owned by Charles T. Barney before Loew).

The contents of his home in Old Westbury, including "a quantity of eighteenth-century cabinetwork, British sporting paintings, views and portraits, Chinese and French porcelain, antique textiles and fine Oriental rugs", were auctioned off in early 1951. The English furniture, silver, paintings and other household items from his New York residence were auctioned off after his death.
