= George Augustus Baker =

American painter

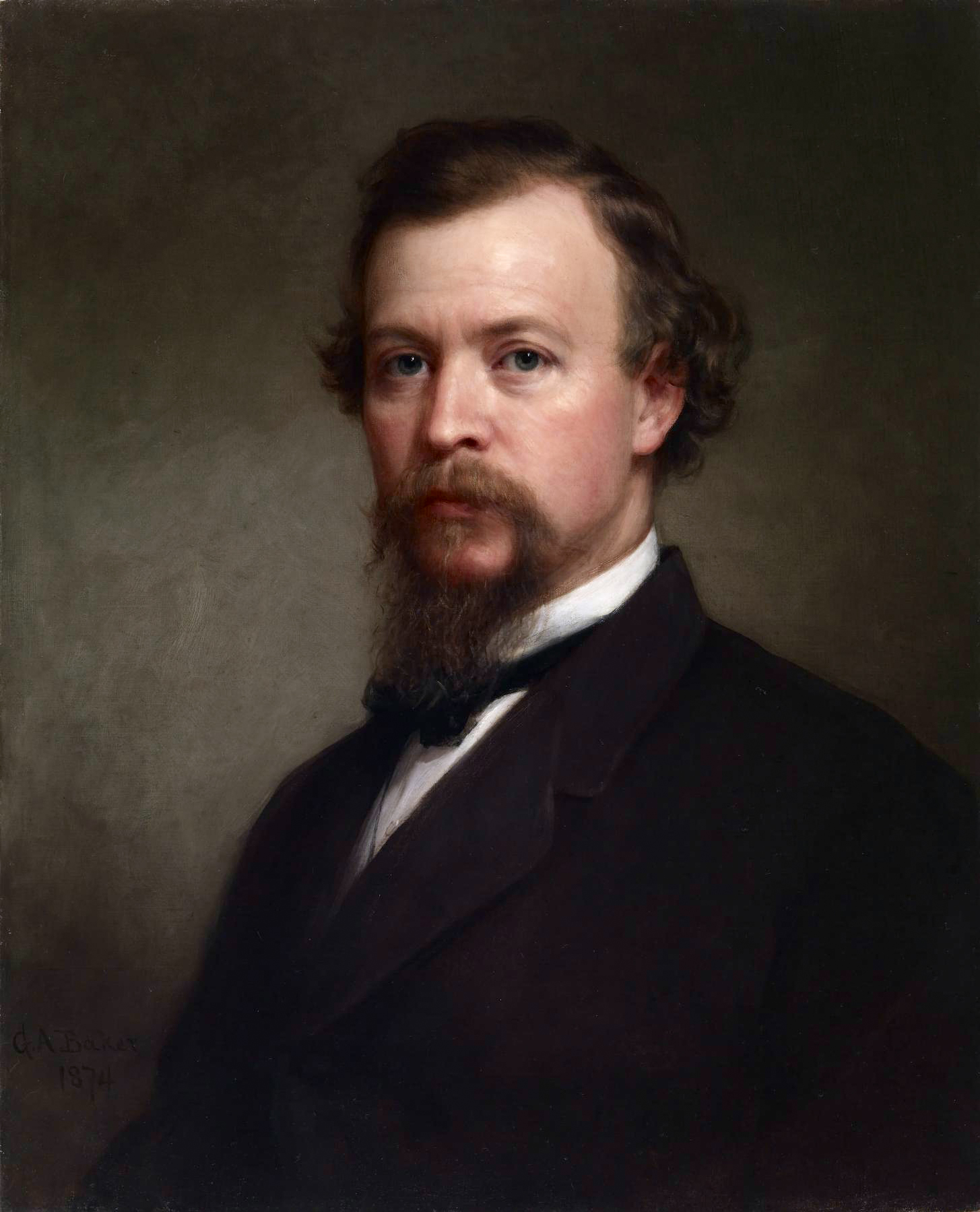
- self-portrait, 1874
- Born: March 19, 1821; New York City
- Died: April 2, 1880 (aged 59); New York City
- Occupation: Painter
- Children: George Augustus Baker
- Parent(s): George Augustus Baker, Sr.

George Augustus Baker (March 19, 1821 – April 2, 1880) was an American portrait painter.

George Augustus Baker was born on March 19, 1821 in New York City. His artistic education was begun by his father George Augustus Baker, Sr. (1760-1847), an artist of merit, and his first professional years were devoted to the then popular miniatures on ivory; but he soon became a portrait painter of rare excellence, his favorite subjects being women and children. In 1844 he went to Europe and spent two years in study. Returning to New York, he opened a studio, and soon ranked among the best portrait painters of the time. He was elected a member of the National Academy of Design in 1851. During the last twenty-five years of his life he had few rivals. His portraits are characterized by a wonderful richness of coloring and a life-like rendering of flesh-tints. They are chiefly in private collections. The best known of his ideal works are "Love at First Sight," "Wild Flowers," "Children of the Wood," "Faith," and "The May Queen." His son, George Augustus Baker (1849-1906), was an author and lawyer.

George Augustus Baker died on 2 April 1880 in New York City.
