= Florence Baker Loew =

American philanthropist and horticulturist

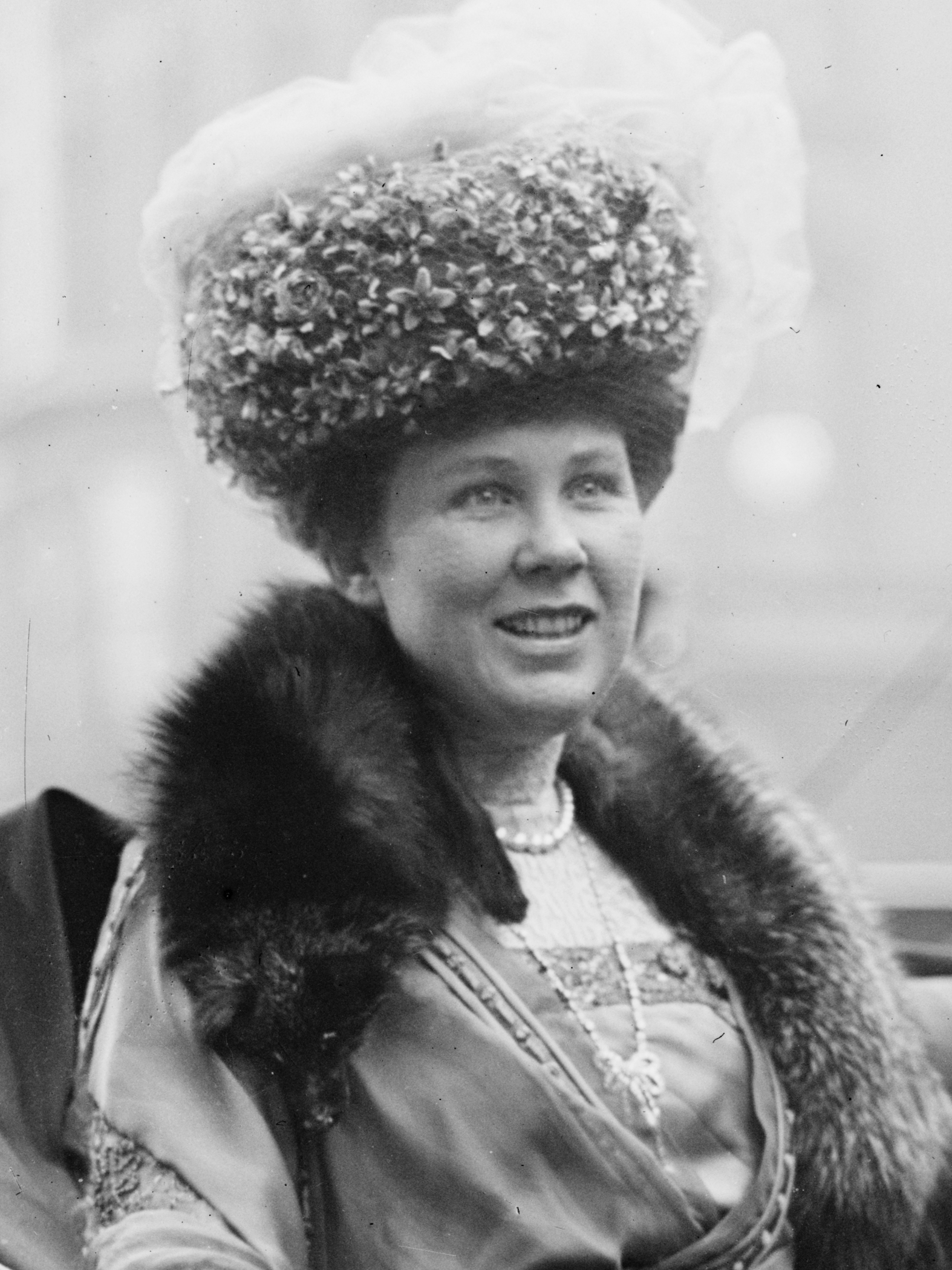
- Mrs. William Goadby Loew in 1911
- Born: Florence Bellows Baker; 1876; New York City, U.S.
- Died: 1936 (aged 59–60); New York City, U.S.
- Resting place: Locust Valley Cemetery, Locust Valley, New York.
- Occupations: horsewoman; philanthropist; horticulturist
- Spouse: William Goadby Loew (m. 1898)
- Parent(s): George Fisher Baker; Florence Tucker Baker

Florence Bellows Baker Loew (1876–1936) was an American horsewoman, philanthropist, and award-winning horticulturist.

She was born in 1876, the daughter of George Fisher Baker, a wealthy banker. On April 12, 1898, she married William Goadby Loew at All Souls' Unitarian Church in New York City.

She died on May 24, 1936, in her townhouse at 56 East 93rd Street in New York City. The mansion is now known as the William Goadby Loew House. She is buried with her husband at Locust Valley Cemetery in Locust Valley, New York.
