= George Baker (cricketer, born 1862) =

English cricketer

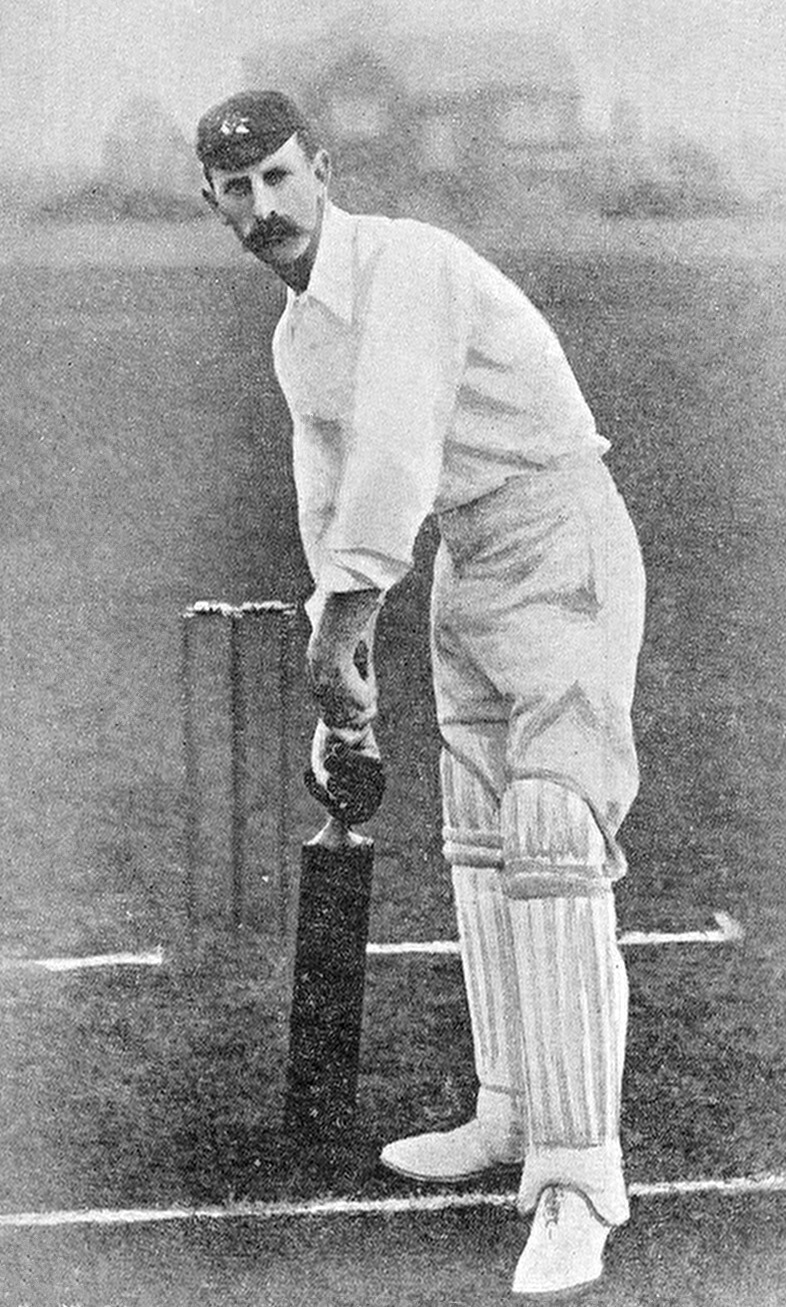

Personal information
- Full name: George Robert Baker
- Born: 18 April 1862; New Malton, Yorkshire, England
- Died: 6 February 1938 (aged 75); Wing Hill, Buckinghamshire, England
- Batting: Right-handed
- Bowling: Right-arm medium

Domestic team information
- Years: Team
- 1884: Yorkshire
- 1887–1899: Lancashire

Career statistics
Competition	First-class
Matches	249
Runs scored	7,563
Batting average	21.48
100s/50s	4/39
Top score	186
Balls bowled	9,061
Wickets	145
Bowling average	29.43
5 wickets in innings	6
10 wickets in match	0
Best bowling	6/18
Catches/stumpings	152/–
- Source: CricketArchive, 27 July 2012

George Robert Baker (18 April 1862 – 6 February 1938) was an English first-class cricketer, who played seven matches for Yorkshire in 1884, and then 227 games for Lancashire between 1887 and 1899. Baker umpired one first-class match in 1901.

== Life and career ==
Baker was born in New Malton, Yorkshire, England. He was a right-handed middle-order batsman, who scored 7,563 runs in 249 first-class matches, at an average of 21.28 with four centuries and 39 fifties. His best score was 186 against Sussex, and he posted 153 against Nottinghamshire, 140 against Hampshire and 109 against Kent. He was a fairly moderate performer until 1894, though his first century came in 1892. He passed 1,000 runs in a season only three times, with a best of 1,444 runs in 1897 at an average of 32.81. His three highest centuries came in that season, and his Lancashire aggregate and average in a season, in which the team won the County Championship, were exceeded only by Albert Ward.

He took 152 catches and was an increasingly useful bowler, taking 145 first-class wickets at an average of 24.93 with his right-arm medium pace, including spells of 6 for 18 against Gloucestershire in 1896 and 6 for 28 against Sussex in 1898.

Despite his apparently modest career figures, Baker was accorded a benefit season by Lancashire in 1898, which raised £1,850. His obituary in Wisden in 1939 noted that he was a man of "happy disposition and popular with everyone". He left first-class cricket after the 1899 season, and was later coach at Harrow School for twelve years.

Baker died in February 1938 at Wing Hill, Buckinghamshire, at the age of 75.
