= William Goadby Loew House =

Historic house in Manhattan, New York

- U.S. National Register of Historic Places
- New York State Register of Historic Places
- New York City Landmark
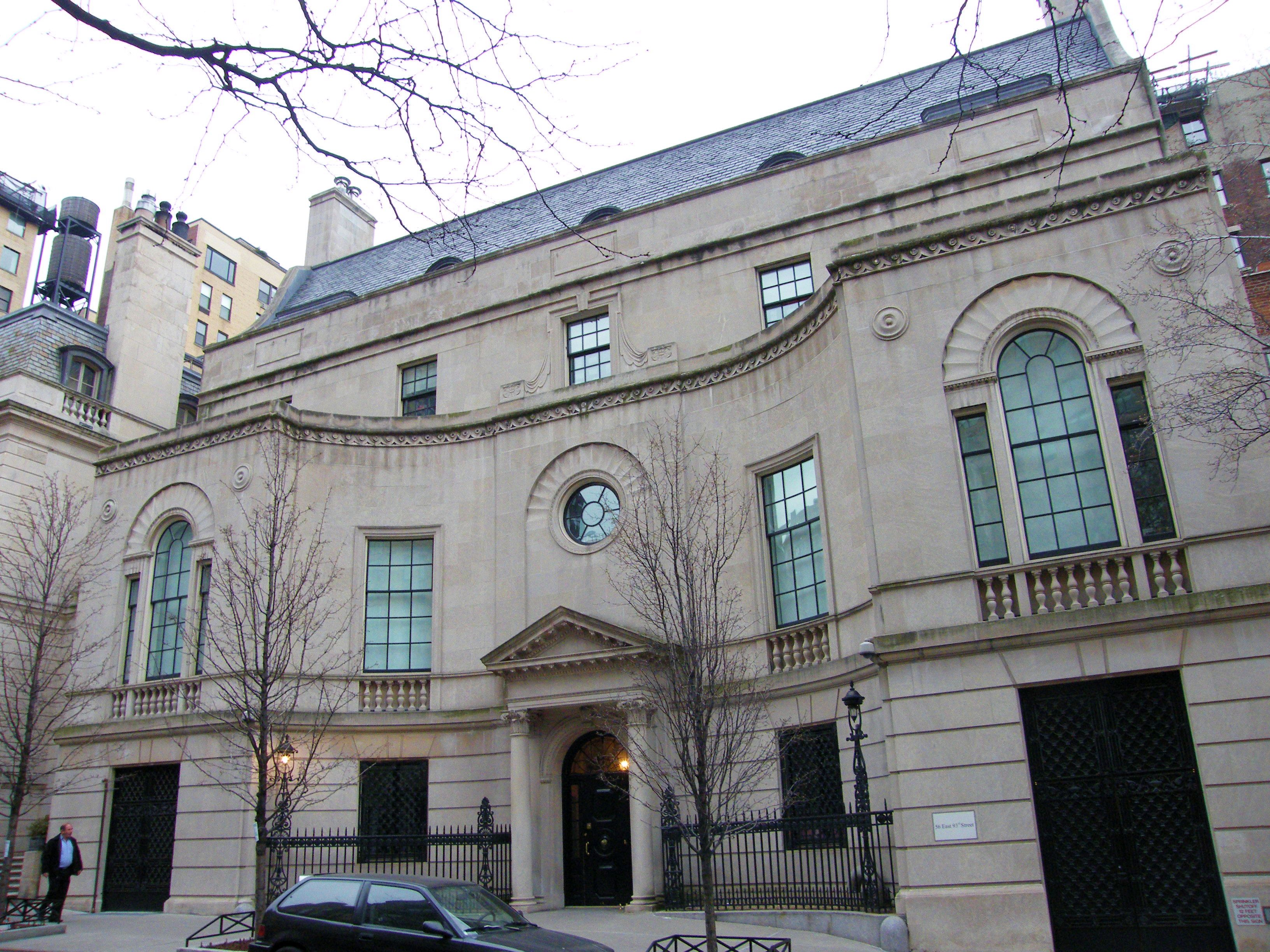
- William Goadby Loew House

- Location within New York City Location within New York Location within the United States
- Location: 56 E. 93rd St., New York, New York
- Coordinates: 40°47′6″N 73°57′20″W
- Area: less than one acre
- Built: 1931
- Architect: Walker & Gillette
- Architectural style: English Regency
- NRHP reference No.: 82003384
- NYSRHP No.: 06101.000677
- NYCL No.: 0437

Significant dates
- Added to NRHP: July 15, 1982
- Designated NYSRHP: June 11, 1982
- Designated NYCL: March 14, 1972

The William Goadby Loew House is a mansion located at 56 East 93rd Street on the Upper East Side of Manhattan in New York City.

== History ==
The house was constructed in 1931 for William Goadby Loew, a stockbroker. It was designed by Walker & Gillette in the English Regency style. Formerly known as the Smithers Alcoholism Center, the Spence School's Lower School is now located there.

The house was added to the National Register of Historic Places in 1982. It is located beside the former Mrs. Graham Fair Vanderbilt House at 60 East 93rd Street.

== See also ==
- List of New York City Designated Landmarks in Manhattan from 59th to 110th Streets
- National Register of Historic Places listings in Manhattan from 59th to 110th Streets
