= George Fisher Baker =

American financier (1840–1931)

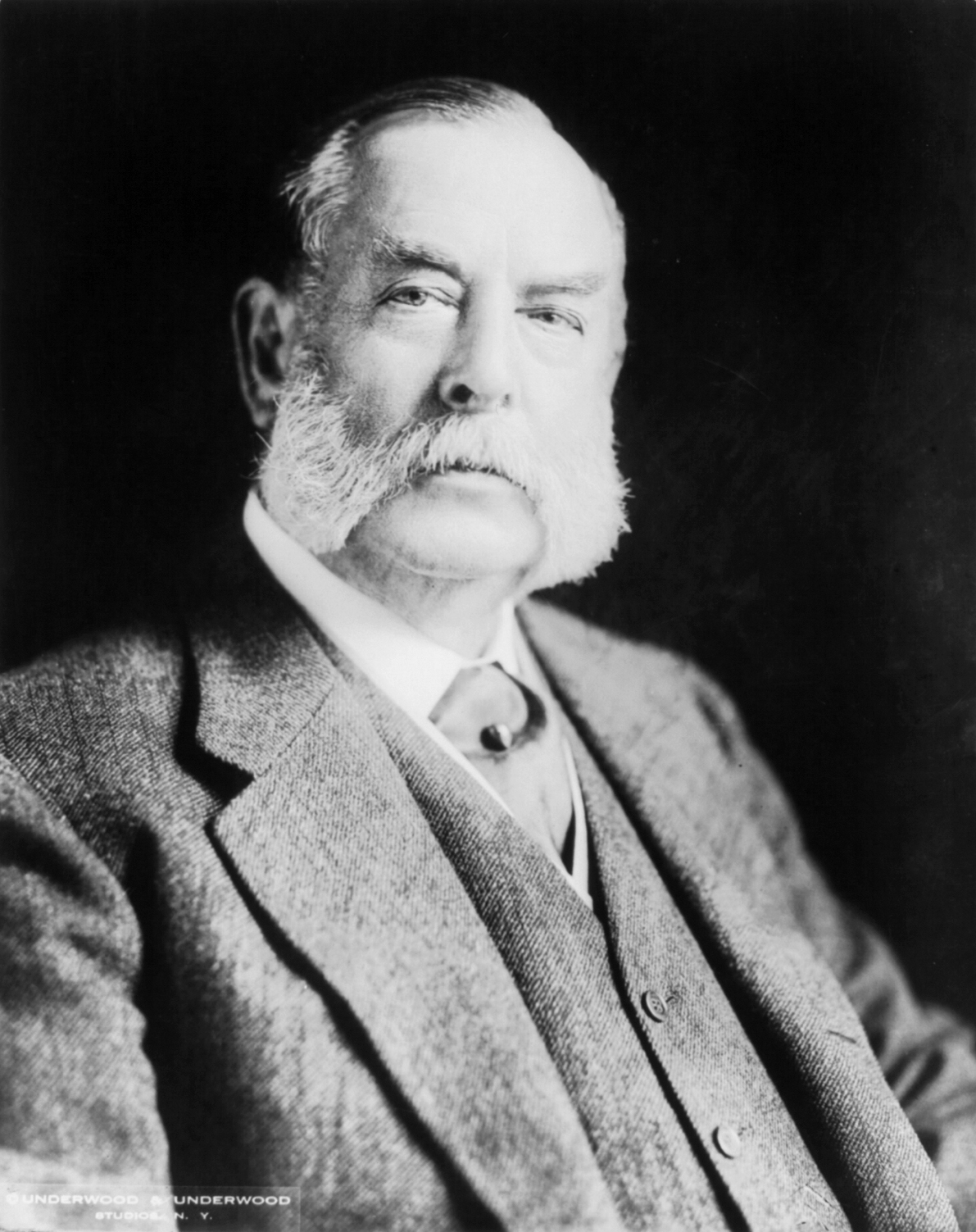

President of First National Bank of New York
- In office 1877–1909
- Preceded by: Samuel C. Thompson
- Succeeded by: Francis L. Hine

Personal details
- Born: March 27, 1840 Troy, New York, U.S.
- Died: May 2, 1931 (aged 91) New York City, U.S.
- Spouse: Florence Tucker Baker
- Children: Evelyn Baker; Florence Bellows Baker; George Fisher Baker Jr.
- Known for: Financial acumen; philanthropy

George Fisher Baker (March 27, 1840 – May 2, 1931) was an American financier and philanthropist. Known as the "Dean of American Banking", he was also known for his taciturnity. Baker made a fortune after the Civil War in railroads and banking, and at his death was estimated to be the third-richest man in the United States, after Henry Ford and John D. Rockefeller.

== Early life and education ==
Baker was born in Troy, New York, to Eveline Stevens Baker and George Ellis Baker, a shoe-store owner who was elected in 1850 on the Whig ticket to the New York State Assembly. At 14, young George entered the S.S. Seward Institute in Florida, New York, where he studied geography, bookkeeping, history, and algebra. At 16, he was hired as a junior clerk in the New York State Banking Department.

== Career ==
Following the outbreak of the American Civil War, Baker enlisted in the 18th Regiment of the Massachusetts Volunteers, in which he achieved the ranks of first lieutenant and adjutant.

In 1863, Baker, along with his mentor, John Thompson, and Thompson's sons Frederick Ferris Thompson and Samuel C. Thompson, co-founded the First National Bank of the City of New York. The first national bank to be chartered in New York City under the National Currency Act of 1863, it became a forerunner of today's Citibank, N.A.

Baker became First National's president at age 37, on September 1, 1877. His 20,000 shares were worth about $20 million ($604,687,500 today). He retired as president in 1909, and became chairman of the board. He was succeeded in the presidency by Francis L. Hine, the former vice president of the bank.

An avid investor, he held interests in many corporations and was the largest stockholder in the Central Railroad of New Jersey. He was a director in 22 corporations, which with their subsidiaries had aggregate resources of $7.27 billion. He was the largest individual owner of U.S. Steel stock; in the early 1920s, his shares were worth some $5,965,000 (equivalent to around $83,245,000 in 2017 dollars), according to a May 4, 1924, article in Time.

=== Media depiction ===
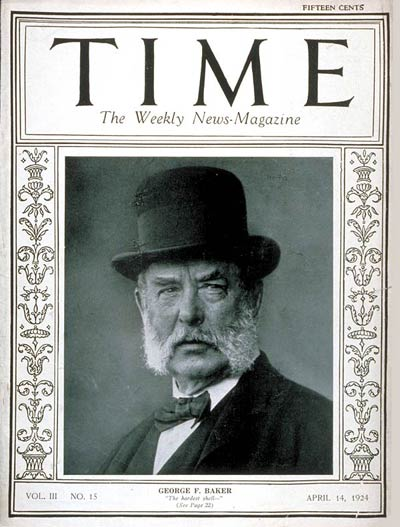
Time cover, April 14, 1924

The April 14, 1924, edition of Time said of Baker:

True, he is twice as rich as the original J.P. Morgan, having a fortune estimated at 200 millions. True, at the age of 84 when he has retired from many directorates, he dominates half a dozen railroads, several banks, scores of industrial concerns.

Baker was "closely associated with" Morgan, the late 19th-century and early 20th-century U.S. robber-baron, monopolist, and Wall Street banker "in his manifold enterprises", according to Richard Boyer and Herbert Morais's 1955 book, Labor's Untold Story. The book notes that "Morgan and associates organized super-trusts in steel (U.S. Steel), shipping (International Mercantile Marine), and agricultural machinery (International Harvester);" and it also "had its hands in other fields—the railroads (where...some 30,000 miles of railway were controlled), anthracite coal (where from two-thirds to three-quarters of the entire shipment was in Morgan hands)." Other Morgan monopolies included electrical machinery (General Electric), communications (AT&T, Western Union), traction companies (IRT in New York, Hudson & Manhattan), and insurance (Equitable Life).

In 1934, Time called him "the richest, most powerful and most taciturn commercial banker in U. S. history", while an article in Newsweek described him as one of the most imposing figures in banking history.

In the November 1994 issue of Worth magazine, James Grant, editor of the financial newsletter Grant's Interest Rate Observer, calls Baker a hidebound turn-of-the-century banker who always got his loans repaid.

Baker was famously silent in public, never commenting on events or giving interviews, until 1922, at age 82, when he gave his first newspaper interview. Thereafter, he spoke occasionally at luncheons and gatherings.

== Businesses ==
The following is a list of businesses in which Baker held a controlling or otherwise significant interest during his lifetime.

- Astor National Bank
- AT&T Corporation
- Bankers Trust
- Central Railroad of New Jersey
- Chase National Bank
- Delaware, Lackawanna and Western Railroad
- Erie Railroad
- First National Bank of New York
- Great Northern Railroad
- Lehigh Valley Railroad
- Manhattan Company
- Mutual Life Insurance Company of New York
- National Bank of Commerce in New York
- New York Central Railroad
- New York, New Haven and Hartford Railroad
- Northern Pacific Railroad
- Reading Railroad
- Richmond & Danville Railroad
- Rock Island Line
- Southern Railway
- U.S. Steel

== Personal life ==
In 1869, Baker was married to Florence Tucker Baker, a daughter of Benjamin Franklin Baker and Sophronia J. (nee Whitney) Baker. Together, they were the parents of:

- Evelyn Baker (1870–1936), who married Howard Bligh St. George in 1891. They had 5 children, with the oldest, George Baker Bligh St. George marrying Katharine Price Collier.
- Florence Bellows Baker (1876–1936), who married William Goadby Loew.
- George Fisher Baker Jr. (1878–1937), who married Edith Brevoort Kane. Their daughter Elizabeth married John M. Schiff of Kuhn, Loeb & Co. and their son, George F. Baker III married Frances Drexel Munn, a daughter of Mary Astor Paul and member of the Drexel banking family.

He was a member of the Jekyll Island Club (aka The Millionaires Club) on Jekyll Island, Georgia. He was also a member of the New York Yacht Club, having been elected in 1895.

Baker died in New York City on May 2, 1931.

=== Properties ===
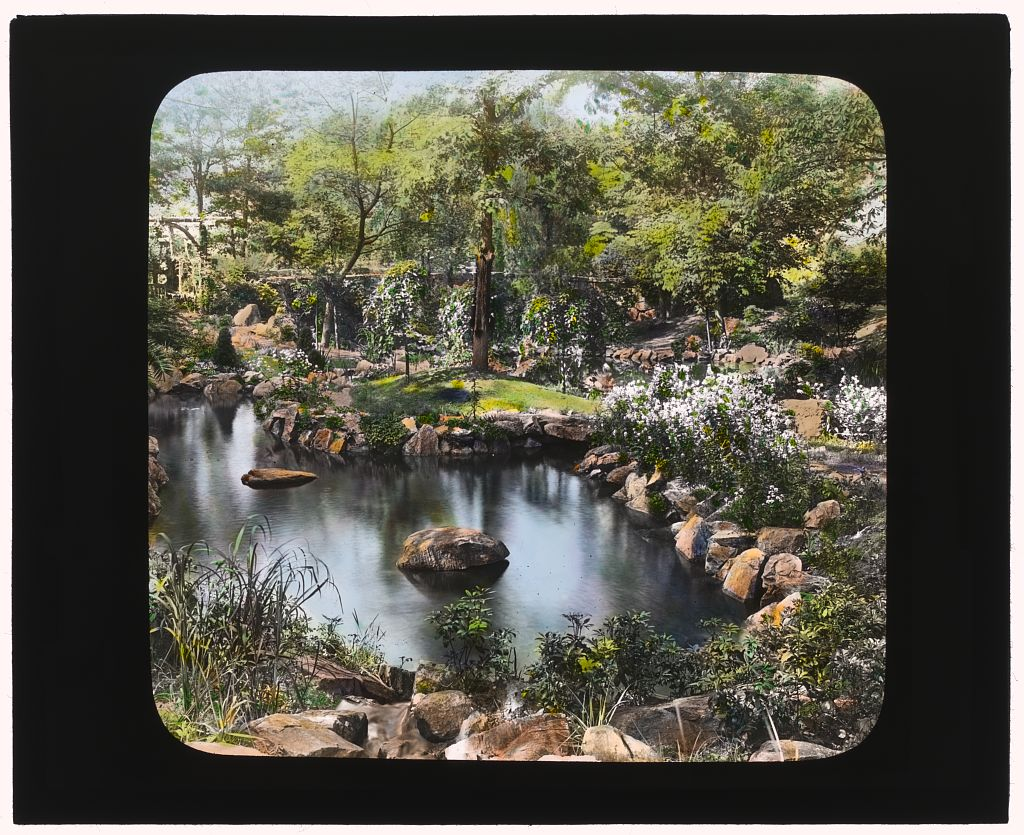
Baker's estate in Tuxedo Park

Baker lived on Madison Avenue in New York City, and maintained a summer property on Jekyll Island near Brunswick, Georgia, and had an estate in Tuxedo Park, New York.

=== Top Hat LeBaron Pierce-Arrow ===
In 1929, Baker commissioned the construction of a unique Pierce-Arrow town car for the wedding of his daughter. Built by LeBaron, the car's roof line was 5 inches taller than standard models so Baker could keep his top hat on. Trim lining in the rear compartment is made of 24-carat gold, as are perfume dispensers and an intercom.

=== Philanthropy ===
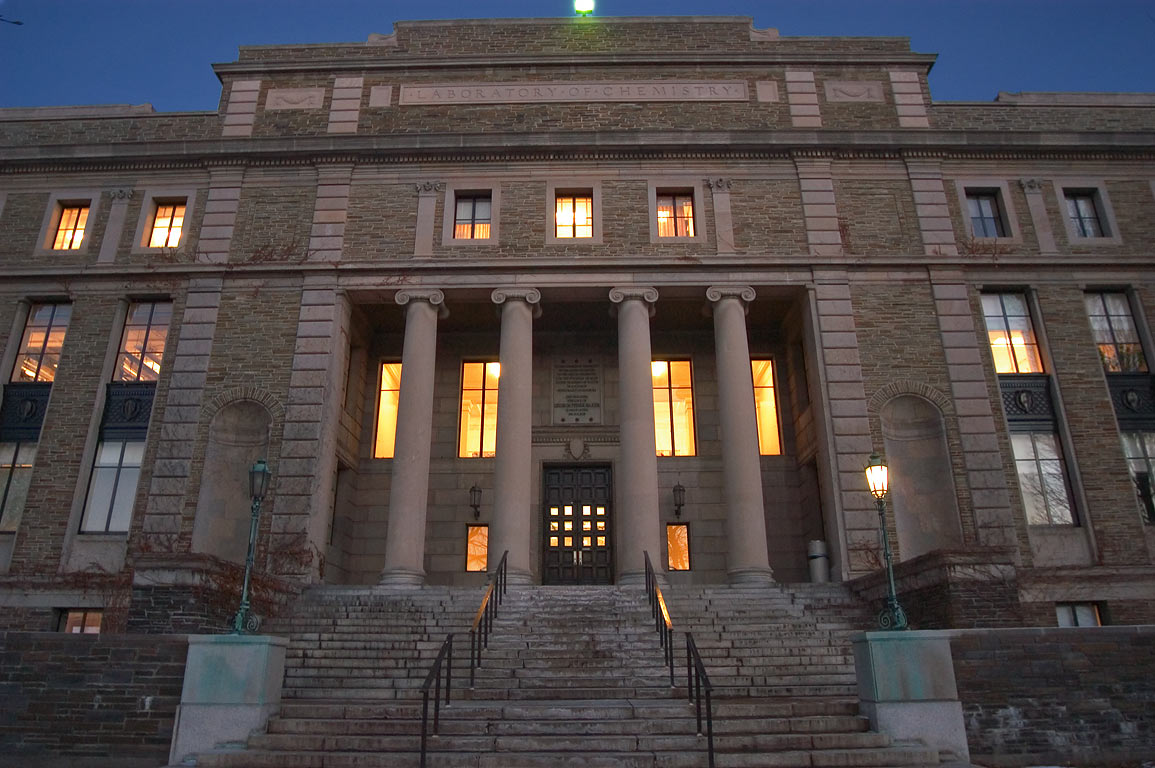
Baker Laboratory at Cornell University

Baker provided much of the initial funding for Harvard Business School with a 1924 grant of $5 million, for which Harvard gave him an honorary doctorate and named the library after him.

In 1922, Baker established a $1 million dollar endowment fund for the Metropolitan Museum of Art. Baker had been a member of the museum board since 1909.

Baker donated $2 million to Cornell University for the construction of the Baker Laboratory of Chemistry, as well as Baker dormitories, and he endowed the Baker Lecture Series, the oldest continuous lectureship in chemistry in the United States.

He made other large donations to charitable causes throughout New York City and funded the construction of Baker Field, Columbia University's primary athletic facility. He provided $2 million for Baker Memorial Library at Dartmouth College.

Awards and achievements
Preceded by George V	Cover of Time magazine April 14, 1924	Succeeded by Lou Henry Hoover
