= U.S. Open Polo Championship =

Annual polo championship

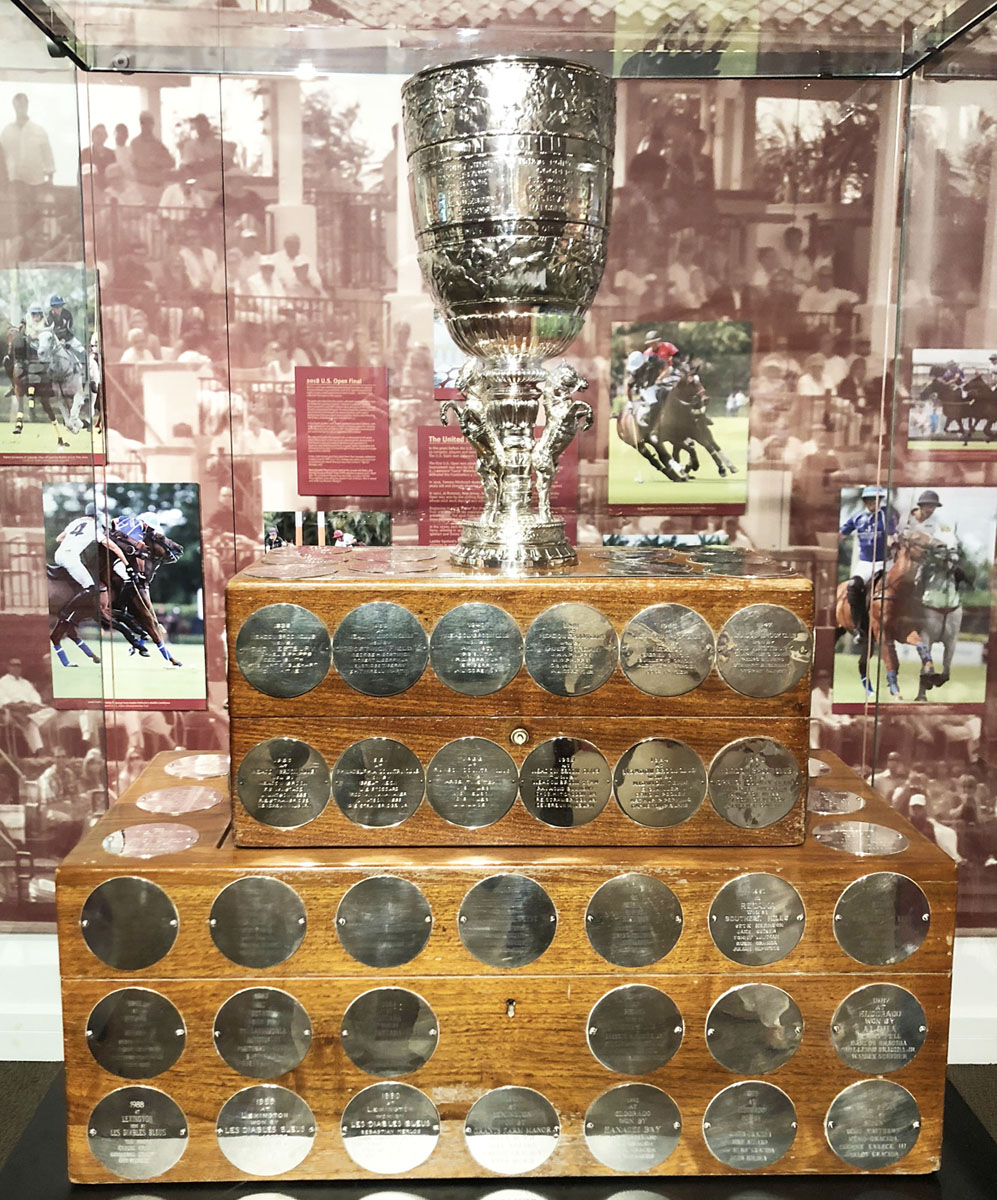
US Open Polo Championship Trophy

The US Open Polo Championship is an annual polo championship in the United States. It is organized since 1904 by the United States Polo Association (USPA).

== History ==
The tournament was first played on September 20, 1904 at Van Cortlandt Park in The Bronx in New York City.

At the first game the Wanderers defeated the Meadowbrook Freebooters.

After the inaugural U.S. Open in 1904, the tournament was not played again until 1910, when it grew to include six teams. It resumed at Narragansett Pier, Rhode Island, where it was played for several years before relocating to what became its longtime home, Meadowbrook Polo Club in Old Westbury, New York.

In 1954, the U.S. Open moved to Oak Brook, Illinois, where it remained for 22 years, followed by an eight-year stint at Retama in San Antonio, Texas.

In the late 1980s and into the 1990s, the tournament circulated among several clubs throughout the United States, including Eldorado, Lexington, Palm Beach and Royal Palm. In 2004, marking one hundred years since the tournament's inception, the U.S. Open Polo Championship relocated to the International Polo Club Palm Beach, where it has been ever since.

Unlike its counterpart the Argentine Open Polo Championship in Argentina, no 40 goal team has ever competed for the U.S. Open Polo Championship. Originally there were no team handicap limits for the U.S. Open, but limits were eventually put in place by the United States Polo Association in the post-WWII era (thereby ending the true "Open" status of the tournament). During most of the post-WWII era the handicap limit per team was 26 goals. In 2019, the United States Polo Association lowered the maximum handicap for the tournament to 22 goals per team in an effort to foster increased tournament participation.

== Trophy ==
The U.S. Open Polo Championship trophy was designed by artist Sally James Farnham. The silver cup features horses and riders in relief around the top perimeter and bottom bowl of the cup with rearing horses rising from the base of the cup.

== Statistics ==
The individual record holder with the most US Open Polo Championships is Guillermo ("Memo") Gracida Jr with 16 total championships.

The individual record holder with the most US Open Polo Championships in a row is Guillermo ("Memo") Gracida Jr with 6 championships in a row (1992 through 1997). The individuals with the second most US Open Polo Championships in a row (four in a row) are Jack Murphy (1964-1967), Ray Harrington Jr. (1966-1969), and Guillermo ("Memo") Gracida Jr (1987-1990).

The two individuals with the greatest length of time between their first victory and their latest victory are Guillermo ("Memo") Gracida Jr (1977 to 2004) and Michael V. ("Mike") Azzaro (1986 to 2013) both with 27 years between first and last wins.

The individual record holder with the most US Open Polo Championship runner-up appearances is Thomas "Tommy" Hitchcock, Jr. with 9 total runner-up appearances.

Only 5 times in history has an identically formed team won the U.S. Open two years in row. Those teams were: Cooperstown (1912 & 1913), Meadow Brook (1919 & 1920), Greentree (1935 & 1936), Old Westbury (1937 & 1938), and Zacara (2012 & 2013). Zacara was the only team to do it in the team-handicap-limit era. No identically formed team has ever won the U.S. Open three years in a row.

The Championship has been won four times by non-U.S. based teams. The foreign winners were: Ranelagh from England (1910), the Argentine Polo Federation team (1922), the Argentine Santa Paula team (1931), and Mexico (1946).

On April 12, 1998, Nic Roldan became the youngest player to ever win the Championship. He was 15 years and 129 days old. On April 18, 2021, Adolfo "Poroto" Cambiaso Jr. became the second youngest player to ever win the Championship. He was 15 years and 143 days old.

There are three players who won the U.S. Open while simultaneously holding office as Chairman of the USPA. They were: Louis E. Stoddard (1927), Elbridge T. Gerry (1940), and William T. Ylvisaker (1972).

== Champions ==
Year	Winner	Players / (Handicap)	Team Hcap	Score	Runner Up	Players / (Handicap)	Team Hcap	Host
1904	Wanderers	Charles Randolph Snowden (6), John E Cowdin (8), Monte Waterbury (8), Lawrence Waterbury (9)	31	4 1/2–3	Freebooters	Devereux Milburn (4), Rodolphe L. "Dolph" Agassiz (9), Foxhall P. Keene (9), Joshua Crane (6)	28	Van Cortlandt Park
1905	Not held							
1906	Not held							
1907	Not held							
1908	Not held							
1909	Not held							
1910	Ranelagh	Riversdale N. Grenfell, Francis Grenfell, Earl of Rocksavage, F.A. Gill		7 3/4–3 3/4	Point Judith Perroquets	Hugh Drury, Frederick Prince, Rodolphe L. "Dolph" Agassiz, William Balding		Point Judith CC, Narragansett Pier
1911	Not held							
1912	Cooperstown	Francis S. von Stade (4), Charles C. "Pad" Rumsey (5), Charles P. Beadleston (4), Malcolm Stevenson		9–5 3/4	Bryn Mawr	Alexander Brown, H.W. Harrison (5), Robert E. Strawbridge Sr., Charles Randolph Snowden		Point Judith CC, Narragansett Pier
1913	Cooperstown	Francis S. von Stade (5), Charles C. "Pad" Rumsey (5), Charles P. Beadleston (5), Malcolm Stevenson (7)	22	7–2 1/2	Point Judith	J.M. Waterbury Jr, J. Watson Webb, Devereux Milburn, Lord Wodehouse		Point Judith CC, Narragansett Pier
1914	Meadow Brook Magpies	Norcross L. Tilney, J. Watson Webb, William G. Loew, Howard Phipps		11–8 3/4	Point Judith	W. Plunket Stewart, Earle W. Hopping, Alexander Brown, Philip Syng Physick Randolph Jr.		Point Judith CC, Narragansett Pier
1915	Not held							
New rule is enacted allowing for free hits after penalties instead of deducting fractions of goals for fouls.
1916	Meadow Brook	Howard Phipps, Charles C. "Pad" Rumsey, William G. Loew, Devereux Milburn		8–3	Coronado	Gustave Maurice Heckscher, Elliott C. Bacon, Earle W. Hopping, Malcolm Stevenson		Philadelphia CC grounds at Bala, PA
1917	Not held							
1918	Not held							
1919	Meadow Brook	Frederick H. Prince Jr., J. Watson Webb, Francis S. von Stade, Devereux Milburn		5–4	Cooperstown	Louis E. Stoddard, Thomas "Tommy" Hitchcock, Jr., Charles C. "Pad" Rumsey, Robert E. Strawbridge Jr.		Philadelphia CC grounds at Bala, PA
1920	Meadow Brook	Frederick H. Prince Jr., J. Watson Webb, Robert E. Strawbridge Sr., Devereux Milburn		12–3	Cooperstown	Frederick H. Prince Jr, Rodman Wanamaker 2nd, Charles C. "Pad" Rumsey, J.C. Cowden		Meadow Brook
1921	Great Neck	Louis E. Stoddard, Rodman Wanamaker, 2nd, J. Watson Webb, Robert E. Strawbridge Jr.		8–6	Rockaway	Morgan Belmont, Thomas "Tommy" Hitchcock, Jr., Benjamin K. Gatins, John C. Cowdin		Philadelphia CC grounds at Bala, PA
1922	Argentine Polo Federation	Juan B. Miles, Juan D. Nelson, David B. Miles, Luis L. Lacey		14–7	Meadow Brook	Francis S. von Stade, Thomas "Tommy" Hitchcock, Jr., Elliott C. Bacon, Devereux Milburn		Rumson CC, Rumson, NJ
1923	Meadow Brook	Raymond Belmont, Thomas "Tommy" Hitchcock, Jr., Robert E. Strawbridge Jr., Devereux Milburn		12–9	British Army	Colonel T.P. Melvill, Lieut. J.S. Leaf, Major Frank B. Hurndall, Maj. Vivian N. Lockett		Meadow Brook
1924	Midwick	Edgar G. Miller, Eric L. Pedley, Arthur P. Perkins, Carleton F. Burke		6–5	Wanderers	Henry C. Lacey, Thomas "Tommy" Hitchcock, Jr., Louis E. Stoddard, Elmer Boeseke Sr.		Meadow Brook
1925	Orange County	W. Averell Harriman, J. Watson Webb, Malcolm Stevenson, John C. Cowdin		11–9	Meadow Brook	Cornelius V. "Sonny" Whitney, Thomas "Tommy" Hitchcock, Jr., Elmer Boeseke Sr., Devereux Milburn		Meadow Brook
1926	Hurricanes	Stephen "Laddie" Sanford, Eric L. Pedley, Capt. Charles T.I. Roark, Robert E. Strawbridge Jr.		7–6	Argentine	Carlos Land, Jack Nelson, Luis L. Lacey, Manuel Andrada		Meadow Brook
1927	Sands Point	W. Averell Harriman, Thomas "Tommy" Hitchcock, Jr., John C. Cowdin, Louis E. Stoddard		11–7	Army-in-India	Capt. Richard George, Capt. John Dening, Maj. Eric Atkinson, Lt. Humphrey Guinness, Lt. Col George de la Poer Beresford		Meadow Brook
1928	Meadow Brook	Cornelius V. "Sonny" Whitney, Winston Guest, Juan B. Miles, Malcolm Stevenson		8–5	United States Army	Lieut. McDowell Jones (4), Capt. Charley Gerhardt, Capt. Peter P. Rodes, Capt. George E. Huthsteiner		Meadow Brook
1929	Hurricanes	Stephen "Laddie" Sanford, Capt. Charles T.I. Roark, J. Watson Webb, Robert E. Strawbridge Jr.		11–7	Sands Point	W. Averell Harriman, Earle A.S. Hopping, Thomas "Tommy" Hitchcock, Jr., A. Charles Schwartz		Meadow Brook
1930	Hurricanes	Stephen "Laddie" Sanford, Eric L. Pedley (8), Capt. Charles T.I. Roark (9), Robert E. Strawbridge Jr.		6–5	Templeton	Raymond Guest, Winston Guest (8), Lewis Lacey (9), Lt. Humphrey Guinness (7)		Meadow Brook
1931	Santa Paula	Andres Gazzotti, Juan J. Reynal, Jose J. Reynal, Manuel Andrada		11–8	Hurricanes	Stephen "Laddie" Sanford, Winston Guest, Capt. Charles T.I. Roark, Terence Preece		Meadow Brook
1932	Templeton	Mike Phipps, Winston Guest, Stewart B. Iglehart, Raymond Guest		16–3	Greentree	Jock Whitney, Eric Horace Tyrrell-Martin (7), Gerald Balding, Hubert "Rube" Williams		Meadow Brook
1933	Aurora	Seymour Knox, J.P. Mills, Elbridge T. Gerry, E.J. Boeseke Jr		14–11	Greentree	Jock Whitney, Cecil Smith, Gerald Balding, Ivor Balding		Meadow Brook
1934	Templeton	Mike Phipps (7), Winston Guest (8), Stewart B. Iglehart (7), Raymond Guest (6)	28	10–7	Aurora	Seymour Knox (7), J.P. Mills (8), William Post Jr (7), E.J. Boeseke Jr (10)	32	Meadow Brook
1935	Greentree	George H. "Pete" Bostwick, Thomas "Tommy" Hitchcock, Jr., Gerald Balding, Jock Whitney		7–6	Aurora	Seymour Knox, J.P. Mills, Elbridge T. Gerry, William Post Jr		Meadow Brook
1936	Greentree	George H. "Pete" Bostwick (6), Thomas "Tommy" Hitchcock, Jr. (10), Gerald Balding (9), Jock Whitney (5)	30	11–10	Templeton	Mike Phipps 9, J.P. Mills, Stewart B. Iglehart, Winston Guest		Meadow Brook
1937	Old Westbury	Mike Phipps (9), Cecil Smith (10), Stewart B. Iglehart (10), Cornelius V. "Sonny" Whitney		11–6	Greentree	George H. "Pete" Bostwick, Gerald Balding, Thomas "Tommy" Hitchcock, Jr., Jock Whitney		Meadow Brook
1938	Old Westbury	Mike Phipps (9), Cecil Smith (10), Stewart B. Iglehart (10), Cornelius V. "Sonny" Whitney		16–7	Greentree	George H. "Pete" Bostwick, Roberto Cavanagh, Thomas "Tommy" Hitchcock, Jr., Jock Whitney		Meadow Brook
1939	Bostwick Field	George H. "Pete" Bostwick, Bobby Gerry, Jr., Elbridge T. Gerry, Eric Horace Tyrrell-Martin		8–7	Greentree	J. Peter Grace Jr, Bob Skene, Thomas "Tommy" Hitchcock, Jr., Jock Whitney		Meadow Brook
U.S. Open match format is changed from 8 chukkers to 6 chukkers.
1940	Aknusti	Gerald Smith, Bobby Gerry, Jr. (8), Elbridge T. Gerry (9), Alan L. Corey, Jr.		5–4	Great Neck	George Mead, J. Peter Grace Jr, Stewart B. Iglehart, Robert E. Strawbridge Jr.		Meadow Brook
1941	Gulf Stream	Ben Phipps (3), Mike Phipps (8), Charles Skiddy von Stade (6), Alan L. Corey, Jr. (6)	23	10–6	Aknusti	Edward H Gerry (4), George H. "Pete" Bostwick (7), Elbridge T. Gerry (9). Henry A Gerry (4)	24	Meadow Brook
1942	Not held							
1943	Not held							
1944	Not held							
1945	Not held							
1946	Mexico	Gabriel Gracida, Guillermo Gracida, Alejandro Gracida, Jose Gracida		11–9	Los Amigos	Antonio Nava Castillo, Stewart B. Iglehart, Michael Phipps, Alberto Ramos Sesma		Meadow Brook
1947	Old Westbury	Pedro Silvero, Clarence C. Combs Jr., Stewart B. Iglehart, George Oliver		10–7	Mexico	Gabriel Gracida, Guillermo Gracida, Alejandro Gracida, Grijaiva Sonora		Meadow Brook
1948	Hurricanes	Stephen "Laddie" Sanford, Larry J. Sheerin, Peter Perkins, Cecil Smith		7–6	Great Neck	Eddie O'Brien, J. Peter Grace Jr, George Oliver, Alan Corey, Jr.		Meadow Brook
1949	Hurricanes	Larry J. Sheerin, Roberto Cavanagh, Cecil Smith, Stephen "Laddie" Sanford		10–4	El Trebol	Juan Reynal, Julio Menditeguy, Carlos Menditeguy, Horacio Castilla		Meadow Brook
1950	Bostwick Field	George H. "Pete" Bostwick, George K. Oliver, Alan Corey, Jr., Devereux Milburn Jr.		7–5	California	Robert Fletcher, Clarence Combs, Jr., Bob Skene, Carlton Beal		Meadow Brook
1951	Milwaukee	Pedro Silvero, Peter Perkins, George K. Oliver, Robert A. Uihlein Jr.		6–2	Meadow Brook	C.R. Leonard, Jr., Clarence Combs, Jr., Alan Corey, Jr., Albert Parsells		Meadow Brook
1952	Beverly Hills	Robert Fletcher, Tony Veen, Bob Skene (10), Carlton Beal		9–6	San Francisco	Victor Graber, Eric L. Pedley, William R. Linfoot, Robert Smith		Beverly Hills
1953	Meadow Brook	Henry Lewis III, Philip L.B. Iglehart, Alan Corey, Jr., George H. "Pete" Bostwick		7–4	Chicago	Paul Butler, Lewis Smith, Cecil Smith, Thomas Healey		Meadow Brook
1954	C.C.C.-Meadow Brook	A. Donald Beveridge, George H. "Pete" Bostwick, Alan Corey, Jr., Harold L. Barry		10–5	Brandywine	Herbert Pennell, Ray Harrngton, Clarence C. Combs Jr., William A. "Billy" Mayer		Oak Brook
1955	C.C.C.	A. Donald Beveridge, William R. Linfoot, Paul (Bill) Barry, Harold L. Barry		9–8	Brandywine	Raworth Williams, Ray Harrington Jr., Clarence C. Combs Jr., William A. "Billy" Mayer		Oak Brook
1956	Brandywine	Raworth Williams, Ray Harrington Jr., Clarence C. Combs Jr., William A. "Billy" Mayer		11–10	Aurora	William T. Ylvisaker, Northrup R. Knox (7), Lewis Smith (8), Seymour H. Knox III (5)		Oak Brook
1957	Detroit C.C.C.	A. Donald Beveridge, Robert Beveridge, George K. Oliver, Harold L. Barry		13–3	Aiken	Vincent Rizzo, George H. "Pete" Bostwick, Alan Corey, Jr., Devereux Milburn Jr.		Oak Brook
1958	Dallas	Raworth Williams, William R. Linfoot, Bob Skene (10), Luis Ramos		7–5	Solo Cup	Delmar Carroll, Ray Harrington Jr., William A. "Billy" Mayer, Russell Firestone		Oak Brook
1959	Circle F	Delmar Carroll, Ray Harrington Jr., William A. "Billy" Mayer, Russell Firestone		8–7	Aurora	Seymour H. Knox III, Northrup R. Knox, Lewis Smith, Horacio Castilla		Oak Brook
1960	Oak Brook C.C.C.	A. Donald Beveridge, Wayne Brown, Cecil Smith, Harold L. Barry		8–5	Royal Palm			Oak Brook
1961	Milwaukee	Guillermo Gracida, Julio Muller, George Oliver, Robert A. Uihlein Jr.		13–9	Beaver Ridge Farm	A. Donald Beveridge, William T. Ylvisaker, Harold L. Barry, John Armstrong		Oak Brook
1962	Santa Barbara	Ronald Tongg, William R. Linfoot, Bob Skene (10), Roy Barry Jr.		8–7	Royal Palm	Bert Beveridge, Robert Beveridge, Harold L. Barry, Ray Harrington Jr.		Oak Brook
1963	Tulsa	John T. Oxley, Ray Harrington Jr., Harold L. Barry, Robert Beveridge		7–6	Crescents	William G. Atkinson, Leslie L. "Bud" Linfoot, Roy Barry, Erwin Anisz		Santa Barbara
1964	Concar Oak Brook	Leslie L. "Bud" Linfoot, Charles W. Smith (4), Julio Muller, Jack Murphy		10–9	Solo Cup Crescents	Vic Graber, James Kraml Jr., Bob Skene, Roy Barry		Oak Brook
1965	Oak Brook-Santa Barbara	Ronald Tongg, Charles W. Smith (6), William R. Linfoot (9), Jack Murphy		11–5	Bunntyco	John Armstrong, Ray Harrington Jr., Roy Barry, Richard Bunn		Oak Brook
1966	Tulsa	John T. Oxley, W. Ray Harrington Jr., Harold L. Barry, Jack Murphy		10–5	Fountain Grove	Robert Walter, Leslie L. "Bud" Linfoot, Roy Barry, Allan Scherer		Santa Barbara
1967	Bunntyco-Oak Brook	Delmar Carroll, W. Ray Harrington Jr., Jack Murphy, Richard Bunn		8–2	Milwaukee			Oak Brook
1968	Midland	George Landreth, W. Ray Harrington Jr., Roy Barry Jr., Harold A. (Joe) Barry		9–8	Milwaukee			Memphis
1969	Tulsa Greenhill	James R. "Hap" Sharp, Thomas "Tommy" Wayman, W. Ray Harrington Jr., William G. Atkinson		11–10	Milwaukee	Hugo Dalmar Jr., Bennie Gutierrez, Harold L. Barry, Robert A. Uihlein III		Oak Brook
1970	Tulsa Greenhill	James R. "Hap" Sharp, Reuben Evans, Harold L. Barry, Harold A. (Joe) Barry		9–5	Oak Brook			Oak Brook
1971	Oak Brook	Hugo Dalmar Jr., Charles W. Smith, Allan Scherer, Robert Beveridge		8–7	Tulsa Greenhill	James R. "Hap" Sharp, William Cort "Corky" Linfoot, Harold L. Barry, Harold A. (Joe) Barry		Oak Brook
1972	Milwaukee	William T. Ylvisaker, Thomas "Tommy" Wayman, Bennie Gutierrez, Robert A. Uihlein III		9–5	Tulsa	Delmar Carroll, John C. "Jack" Oxley, Allan Scherer, Patrick Dix		Oak Brook
1973	Oak Brook	Hugo Dalmar Jr., William G. Atkinson, Charles W. Smith, Robert Beveridge		9–4	Willow Bend	Norman Brinker		Oak Brook
1974	Milwaukee	Delmar Carroll, Thomas "Tommy" Wayman, Harold A. (Joe) Barry, Robert A. Uihlein III		7–6	Houston	William S. Farish III, Red Armour, Roy M. Barry Jr., Charles Wright		Oak Brook
1975	Milwaukee	James I. Uihlein, Thomas "Tommy" Wayman, Harold A. (Joe) Barry, Robert A. Uihlein III		14–6	Tulsa-Dallas			Oak Brook
1976	Willow Bend	William S. Farish III, Charles W. Smith, Roy M. Barry Jr., Norman Brinker		10–5	Tulsa	William "Bill" Sinclaire, Thomas "Tommy" Wayman, Bart Evans, John C. "Jack" Oxley		Oak Brook
1977	Retama	William Cort "Corky" Linfoot, Guillermo Gracida Jr., Harold A. (Joe) Barry, Stephen M. Gose		11–7	Wilson Ranch	Willam B. Wilson, Fortunato Gomez Romero, Antonio Herrera, Ernesto Trotz		Oak Brook
1978	Abercrombie & Kent	Geoffrey Kent, David Wigdahl, Antonio Herrera, Stuart Mackenzie		7–6	Tulsa	Michael Carney, Ronald Tongg, Red Armour, Seth W. Herndon Jr.		Oak Brook
1979	Retama	William Cort "Corky" Linfoot, Guillermo Gracida Jr., Harold A. (Joe) Barry, Stephen M. Gose		6–5	Huisache	Joel R. Baker, Alejandro Soldati (replaced in final by Ken Fransen due to broken shoulder), Charles W. Smith, William S. Farish III		Retama
1980	Southern Hills	Seth W. Herndon Jr., Jake Sieber, Thomas "Tommy" Wayman, Ruben Gracida		9–6	Willow Bend	Joel R. Baker, Charles W. Smith, Roy M. Barry, Norman Brinker		Retama
1981	Rolex A & K	Geoffrey Kent, Joel R. Baker, Antonio Herrera, Stuart Mackenzie		10–9	Retama	Carlos Gracida, Harold A. (Joe) Barry, Guillermo Gracida Jr., Norman Brinker		Retama
1982	Retama	Stephen M. Gose, Guillermo Gracida Jr., Ruben Gracida, Carlos Gracida		11–6	Tulsa	Emil Richard "Dick" Albert III, Julian Hipwood, Howard Hipwood, Podger El-Effendi		Retama
1983	Ft. Lauderdale	John C. "Jack" Oxley, Fortunato Gomez Romero, Bart Evans, Ruben Gracida		8–5	Retama	Tom Gose, Carlos Gracida, Guillermo Gracida Jr. (replaced in final by Howard Hipwood due to broken collarbone), Stephen Gose		Retama
1984	Retama	Thomas Gose, Carlos Gracida, Guillermo Gracida Jr., Stephen Gose		12–9	Ft. Lauderdale	Dale Smicklas		Retama
1985	Carter Ranch	Preston Carter, Guillermo Gracida Jr., Carlos Gracida, Pablo Rincon Gallardo		10–8	Ft. Lauderdale	John C. "Jack" Oxley, Rob Walton, Owen Rinehart, Bart Evans		Retama
1986	Retama II	Michael V. Azzaro, Thomas "Tommy" Wayman, Owen Rinehart, Thomas Gose		8–7	Ft. Lauderdale	John C. "Jack" Oxley, Carlos Gracida, Bart Evans, Joey Casey		Retama
1987	Aloha	Robert Fell, Carlos Gracida, Guillermo Gracida Jr., Warren Scherer		10–9	Los Potros	Michael V. Azzaro, Hector Galindo, Owen Rinehart, Jim Gilstrap		Eldorado
1988	Les Diables Bleus	Ted Moore, Carlos Gracida, Guillermo Gracida Jr., Guy Wildenstein		11–8	Coca-Cola	Skeeter Johnston, Marcos Heguy, Eduardo Novillo Astrada, Jeff Atkinson		Lexington
1989	Les Diables Bleus	Alejandro Agote, Juan I. "Pite" Merlos, Guillermo Gracida Jr., Guy Wildenstein		9–7	Black Bears	Urs Schwarzenbach, Michael V. Azzaro, Owen Rinehart, Guillermo Gracida Jr.		Lexington
1990	Les Diables Bleus	Sebastian Merlos (4), Juan I. "Pite" Merlos, Guillermo Gracida Jr. (10), Guy Wildenstein, Julio Arellano		9–5	Hanalei Bay	Ron Bonaguidi, Alejandro Agote, Carlos Gracida, Michael V. Azzaro		Lexington
1991	Grant's Farm Manor	William Busch, Michael V. Azzaro, Carlos Gracida, Andrew Busch		9–8	Michelob Dry	Phillip Lake, Adam Snow, Owen Rinehart, Bobby Barry		Lexington
1992	Hanalei Bay	Julio Arellano (5), Carlos Gracida (10), Guillermo Gracida Jr. (10), Ronald Bonaguidi		13–6	Fish Creek	Fred Mannix, Owen Rinehart (10), Julio Zavaleta, Francisco "Pancho" Bensadon		Eldorado
1993	Gehache	Ruben Gracida, Michael V. Azzaro, Guillermo Gracida Jr., Glen Holden Sr., Joe Wayne Barry		11–10	Fish Creek	Fred Mannix, Piki Diaz Alberdi, Julio Zavaleta, Joe Henderson		Eldorado
1994	Aspen Polo	Eugene Kneece III, Carlos Gracida, Guillermo Gracida Jr., Douglas Matthews		8–7	White Birch	Bautista Heguy, Mariano Aguerre		Meadow Brook
1995	Outback Steakhouse	Julio Arellano, Sebastian Merlos, Guillermo Gracida Jr., Timothy Gannon		15–6	White Birch	Brandon Phillips, Adolfo Cambiaso, Mariano Aguerre, Peter Brant		Meadow Brook
1996	Outback Polo	Valerio Aguilar, Michael V. Azzaro, Guillermo Gracida Jr., Timothy Gannon, Jeffrey Blake		16–9	Casa Manila	Wesley Pitcock, Marcelo Caset, Marcos Heguy, Luis Escobar		Palm Beach
1997	Isla Carroll	Martin Estrada, Michael V. Azzaro, Guillermo Gracida Jr., John B. Goodman		10–6	White Birch	John Hensley, Adolfo Cambiaso, Mariano Aguerre, Peter Brant		Palm Beach
1998	Escue	Nicolas Roldan, Sebastian Merlos, Juan I. "Pite" Merlos, Stuart "Sugar" Erskine		13–10	Isla Carroll	John B. Goodman (1), Carlos Gracida (9), Guillermo Gracida Jr. (10), Felix Anzorreguy (6)	26	Palm Beach
1999	Outback	Timothy Gannon, Jeffrey Blake, Adolfo Cambiaso, Bartolome Castagnola		13–9	Pony Express	Bob Daniels, Nicolas Roldan, Gonzalo Heguy, Bautista Heguy		Palm Beach
2000	Outback	Philip O. Heatley, Bartolome Castagnola, Adolfo Cambiaso, Sunny Hale		11–8	Everglades	Skeeter Johnston, Tomas Fernandez Llorente, Owen Rinehart, Tommy Biddle		Palm Beach
2001	Outback	Adolfo Cambiaso, Fabio Diniz, Christopher Gannon, Santiago Chavanne		14–12	Orchard Hill	Stuart "Sugar" Erskine, Julio Arellano, Eduardo Heguy, Steve Van Andel		Palm Beach
2002	Coca-Cola	Gillian Johnston, Adam Snow, Miguel Novillo Astrada, Thomas Biddle Jr.		13–10	Orchard Hill	Steve Van Andel, Jeff Hall, Julio Arellano, Eduardo Heguy		Royal Palm
2003	C-Spear	Thomas B. Boyle III, Matias G. Magrini, Carlos Gracida, Jeffrey Hall		14–7	Lechuza Caracas	Victor Vargas, Sebastian Merlos, Juan I. "Pite" Merlos, Jorge Rodriguez		Royal Palm
2004	Isla Carroll	Stuart "Sugar" Erskine (8), Francisco "Pancho" Bensadon (8), Guillermo Gracida Jr. (9), John B. Goodman (1)	26	10–6	White Birch	Del Walton (3), Lucas Criado (9), Mariano Aguerre (10), Peter Brant (4)	26	International Polo Club Palm Beach
2005	White Birch	Julio F. Gracida, Lucas A. Criado, Mariano Aguerre, Peter Brant, Delmar C. Walton, Martin Ravina		11–10	Skeeterville	Skeeter Johnston, Owen Rinehart, Julio Arellano, Lucas Monteverde		International Polo Club Palm Beach
2006	Las Monjitas	Ignacio Novillo Astrada, Eduardo Novillo Astrada, Adam Snow, Camilo Bautista		12–6	Orchard Hill	Steve Van Andel, Jeff Hall, Hector Galindo, Francisco de Narváez		International Polo Club Palm Beach
2007	Crab Orchard	Matias G. Magrini, David "Pelon" Stirling, Adolfo Cambiaso, George Rawlings		15–14	Jedi	Torsten Koch, Pablo Mac Donough, Juan Martin Nero, Cristian J. "Magoo" Laprida		International Polo Club Palm Beach
2008	Crab Orchard	George Rawlings, Adolfo Cambiaso, Jeffrey Blake, Ignacio Heguy		15–12	Las Monjitas	Camilo Bautista, Javier Astrada, Eduardo Astrada, Nacho Astrada		International Polo Club Palm Beach
2009	Audi	Marc Ganzi (1), Facundo Pieres (10), Gonzalo Pieres Jr. (9), Nicolas Pieres (6)	26	9–8	Las Monjitas	Camilo Bautista (0), Adam Snow (8), Eduardo Astrada (9), Nacho Astrada (9)	26	International Polo Club Palm Beach
2010	Crab Orchard	George Rawlings (0), Julio Arellano (8), Adolfo Cambiaso (10), Hilario Ulloa (8)	26	13–8	Audi	Marc Ganzi (1), Facundo Pieres (10), Gonzalo Pieres Jr (10), Inaki Laprida (5)	26	International Polo Club Palm Beach
2011	Lechuza Caracas	Victor Vargas (1), Guillermo "Sapo" Caset (9), Juan Martin Nero (10), Martin Espain (6), Matthew Coppola	26	8–6	Audi	Marc Ganzi (1), Nicolas Pieres (7), Gonzalo Pieres Jr (10), R. Ribeiro de Andrade (8)	26	International Polo Club Palm Beach
2012	Zacara	Facundo Pieres (10), Lyndon Lea (1), Cristian J. "Magoo" Laprida (8), Michael V. Azzaro (7)	26	10–8	Lechuza Caracas	Victor Vargas (1), Guillermo "Sapo" Caset (10), Juan Martin Nero (10), Facundo Obregon (5)	26	International Polo Club Palm Beach
2013	Zacara	Facundo Pieres (10), Lyndon Lea (1), Cristian J. "Magoo" Laprida (8), Michael V. Azzaro (7)	26	16–13	Valiente	Robert P. Jornayvaz III (0), David "Pelon" Stirling (10), Adolfo Cambiaso (10), Santi Torres (6)	26	International Polo Club Palm Beach
2014	Alegria	Julian G. Mannix (3), Hilario Ulloa (9), Mariano Aguerre (9), Clemente Zavaleta Jr. (5)	26	11–10	Valiente	Robert P. Jornayvaz III (1), Santi Torres (6), Guillermo "Sapo" Caset (9), Juan Martin Nero (10)	26	International Polo Club Palm Beach
2015	Valiente	Robert P. Jornayvaz III (2), Alejo Taranco (6), Guillermo Terrera (8), Adolfo Cambiaso (10), Guillermo "Sapo" Caset	26	11–9	Orchard Hill	Steve Van Andel (0), Facundo Pieres (10), Polito Pieres (9), Ezequiel Ferrario (7)	26	International Polo Club Palm Beach
2016	Orchard Hill	Facundo Pieres (10), Julian De Lusarreta (6), Juan Martin Nero (10), Steve Van Andel (0)	26	13–12	Dubai Polo Team	Rashid Albwardy (1), Alejo Taranco (6), Facundo Sola (8), Adolfo Cambiaso (10)	26	International Polo Club Palm Beach
2017	Valiente	Robert P. Jornayvaz III (2), Matias Torres Zavaleta (6), Adolfo Cambiaso (10), Diego Cavanagh (8)	26	13–12	Orchard Hill	Steve Van Andel (1), Polito Pieres (10), Facundo Pieres (10), Juan Pedro Chavanne (5)	26	International Polo Club Palm Beach
2018	Daily Racing Form	Jared Zenni (5), Agustin Obregon (5), Hilario Ulloa (10), Mariano Obregon (6)	26	10–9	Valiente	Robert P. Jornayvaz III (2), Tomas Beresford (4), Facundo Pieres (10), Adolfo Cambiaso (10)	26	International Polo Club Palm Beach
Maximum handicap per team lowered to 22 by United States Polo Association.
2019	Pilot	Curtis Pilot (0), Matias Gonzalez (3), Facundo Pieres (10), Gonzalo Pieres Jr (9)	22	12–7	Las Monjitas	Camilo Bautista (0), Francisco Elizalde (8), Hilario Ulloa (10), Matt Coppola (4)	22	International Polo Club Palm Beach
2020	Not held							
2021	Scone	David Paradice (0), Adolfo "Poroto" Cambiaso Jr. (6), Mariano "Peke" Gonzalez Jr. (6), Adolfo Cambiaso (10)	22	14–13	Park Place	Andrey Borodin (0), Juan Britos (8), Hilario Ulloa (10), Matt Coppola (4)	22	International Polo Club Palm Beach
2022	Pilot	Curtis Pilot (0), Mackenzie Weisz (5), Matias Torres Zavaleta (7), Facundo Pieres (10)	22	11–6	La Elina	Juan Martin Obregon (5), Geronimo Obregon (5), Facundo Obregon (6), Jared Zenni (6)	22	International Polo Club Palm Beach
2023	Park Place	Andrey Borodin (0), Juan Britos (9), Hilario Ulloa (10), Jason Wates (3)	22	12–11	Valiente	Bob Jornayvaz (0), Lucas Criado Jr (6), Mariano Gonzalez Jr (6), Adolfo Cambiaso (10)	22	International Polo Club Palm Beach
2024	La Dolfina	Alejandro Aznar (0), Rufino Merlos (3), Adolfo Cambiaso Jr (10), Tomas Panelo (9)	22	10–7	Valiente	Bob Jornayvaz (0), Mariano Gonzalez Jr (7), Paco de Narvaez (5), Adolfo Cambiaso (10)	22	International Polo Club Palm Beach
2025	La Dolfina Tamera	Alejandro Poma (1), Matt Coppola (4), Diego Cavanagh (7), Adolfo Cambiaso (10)	22	12–8	La Dolfina Catamount	Scott Devon (0), Rufino Merlos (5), Adolfo Cambiaso Jr (10), Jesse Bray (7)	22	International Polo Club Palm Beach
2026	Pilot	Curtis Pilot (0), Mackenzie Weisz (6), Lorenzo Chavanne (7), Camilo "Jeta" Castagnola (10)	22	15–10	BTA	KC Krueger (1), Steve Krueger (5), Tomas Panelo (10), Ignacio "Nachi" Viana (7)	22	International Polo Club Palm Beach

== Multiple U.S. Open Polo Championship Winners ==
Player	Titles	First Title	Most Recent
Guillermo ("Memo") Gracida Jr	16	1977	2004
Adolfo Cambiaso	10	1999	2025
Carlos Gracida	9	1982	2003
Michael V. ("Mike") Azzaro	7	1986	2013
Harold L. Barry	7	1954	1970
Ray Harrington Jr.	7	1956	1969
Harold A. ("Joe") Barry	6	1968	1979
George H. ("Pete") Bostwick	6	1935	1954
Facundo Pieres	6	2009	2022
Thomas ("Tommy") Wayman	6	1969	1986
J. Watson Webb	6	1914	1929
Alan L. Corey Jr.	5	1940	1954
Stewart B. Iglehart	5	1932	1953
Mike Phipps	5	1932	1941
Stephen "Laddie" Sanford	5	1926	1949
Cecil Smith	5	1937	1960
Charles W. Smith	5	1964	1976
Robert E. Strawbridge Jr.	5	1921	1930

== Titles by team ==
Team	Titles
Meadow Brook	8
Oak Brook	6
Milwaukee	5
Retama	5
Hurricanes	5
Outback	5
Tulsa	4
Old Westbury	3
Les Diables Blues	3
Crab Orchard	3
Pilot	3
Bostwick Field	2
Cooperstown	2
Greentree	2
Isla Carroll	2
Santa Barbara	2
Templeton	2
Valiente	2
Zacara	2

== Photographs ==
US Open Polo Trophy Detail	Detail of base of US Open Polo Trophy
