= Harold L. Barry =

American polo player

Harold L. Barry was an American polo player.

He became a nine-goal player in 1956. He won the U.S. Open Polo Championship in 1954 (with A. D. Beveridge, Pete Bostwick and Alan L. Corey, Jr.), 1957 (with A.D. Beveridge, Robert D. Beveridge and George K. Oliver), 1960 (with A. D. Beveridge, Wayne Brown and Cecil Smith), 1963 (with John T. Oxley, W. Ray Harrington, Jr. and Robert D. Beveridge), 1966 (with John T. Oxley, W. Ray Harrington, Jr. and Jack Murphy), and 1970 (with James R. Sharp, Reuben Evans and Harold A. Barry). He also won the National 20 Goal four times, and the Coronation Cup in 1971, 1972, and 1973. He played on the U.S. team against Argentina in 1966 and 1969.

He was inducted into the Museum of Polo and Hall of Fame in Lake Worth, Florida on March 15, 1991.
