= Joe Barry (polo) =

American polo player

Harold A. "Joe" Barry was an American polo player.

== Biography ==
He was born and raised in Truscott, Texas. Later, he moved to San Antonio.

He was a nine-goal player. He won the U.S. Open Polo Championship in 1968 (with George Landreth, W. Ray Harrington Jr. and Roy M. Barry), 1970 (with James R. Sharp, Reuben Evans, Harold L. Barry), 1974 (with Del W. Carroll, Tommy Wayman and Robert Uihlein Jr.), 1975 (with James Uihlein, Tommy Wayman, and Robert Uihlein Jr.), 1977 (with William R. Linfoot, Guillermo Gracida Jr. and Stephen M. Gose), and 1979 (with the same players). He also won three Gold Cups, three Silver Cups, two Butler Handicaps, and two North American titles. He played on the U.S. team in the Cup of the Americas twice, and won the Coronation Cup and Camacho Cup.

He was inducted into the Museum of Polo and Hall of Fame in Lake Worth, Florida, on February 26, 1999. The Joe Barry Memorial Tournament at the International Polo Club Palm Beach is named for him.
