= Gillian Johnston (polo player) =

American polo player and patron

- Occupation: Polo player
- Parent(s): Summerfield Johnston Jr. Gil Johnston
- Relatives: Robert Johnston (brother); Katherine Johnston Tudor (sister); Lavinia Johnston (sister); Summerfield Johnston III (brother)

Gillian Johnston is an American polo player and patron.

== Early life ==
Gillian Johnston is the daughter of Summerfield Johnston Jr., a business executive who served as Chairman of the Board and Chief Executive Officer of Coca-Cola Enterprises from 1991 to 2001, and a polo player. Her mother, Gil Johnston, is a British-born horsebreeder and steeplechaser. Her paternal great-grandfather, James F. Johnston, founded the Coca-Cola Bottling Company, the first Coca-Cola franchiser.

She grew up at Bendabout farm in McDonald in Bradley County, Tennessee. Her brother, Summerfield Johnston III, died from polo-related injuries in 2007.

== Polo ==
She reestablished the Bendabout Polo Club at her family farm in the 1990s. She is the patron and captain of the Coca-Cola Polo Team.

She first competed in the U.S. Open Polo Championship in 1999. Four years later, in 2003, they won the championship at the Royal Palm Polo Club in Boca Raton, Florida alongside Adam Snow, Miguel Novillo Astrada and Tommy Biddle. She and Sunny Hale are the only women to have won this championship.

In 2013, she won the Ylvisaker Cup alongside Sugar Erskine, Julio Arellano and Tommy Collingwood against Marc Ganzi's Audi team.

She serves as the Vice President of the Polo Training Foundation.
