= Summerfield Johnston =

Summerfield Johnston may refer to:

- Summerfield Johnston Jr. (born 1932)
- Summerfield Johnston III (1954–2007)
