= Harold Barry =

Harold Barry may refer to:

- Harold A. Barry, known as Joe, American polo player
- Harold L. Barry, American polo player
