= Glen Holden Sr. =

American polo player and diplomat (1927–2024)

Glen A. Holden Sr. (July 2, 1927 – April 18, 2024) was an American polo player and diplomat who was United States Ambassador to Jamaica.

== Early life ==
Holden was born on July 2, 1927, in Boise, Idaho. He was honorably discharged from the United States Army in January 1946 and began studying at the University of Oregon. He graduated with a bachelor of science in 1951.

== Political career ==
Holden was appointed Ambassador Extraordinary and Plenipotentiary of the United States to Jamaica on July 17, 1989, by George H.W. Bush. He served in this role until March 1993 and later was chair of the charitable body, American Friends of Jamaica.

== Polo career ==
As a polo player, he won the Pacific Coast Open, the U.S. Open Polo Championship in 1993 (with Ruben Gracida, Mike Azzaro, Guillermo Gracida Jr., and Joe Wayne Barry) and the Governors Cup. He has played with Charles III.

Holden was a founding member of the Federation of International Polo and served as its president until 1997. He also served as a governor of the United States Polo Association (USPA) for ten years. He was co-founder of "Polo on the Mall" in Washington, D.C. He was also involved with the Santa Barbara Polo Club in Santa Barbara, California and the Houston Polo Club in Houston, Texas. He sat on the Board of the Polo Training Foundation. He was inducted into the Museum of Polo and Hall of Fame on February 16, 2002. He set up the Holden International Fund to develop the polo skills of young players from around the world.

== Personal life and death ==
Holden was married to Gloria Holden, who predeceased him. Together they had three children, Glen Holden Jr., Georgianne Holden Stone, and Geannie Holden Sheller. Georgianne predeceased him. Glen Holden Jr. is also a polo player.

Glen died on April 18, 2024, at the age of 96.
