= 2019 U.S. Open Polo Championship =

Sports tournament

The 2019 U.S. Open Polo Championship was the 103rd installment of the U.S. Open Polo Championship and was held at the International Polo Club Palm Beach in Wellington, Florida from March 27 to April 21, 2019.

A total of 16 teams entered the tournament and a total of 31 matches were played.

The winning team, Pilot, consisted of Curtis Pilot, Matias Gonzalez, Facundo Pieres, and Gonzalo Pieres Jr.

== Qualifying - Group stage ==
Groups were created via a draw held on the evening of March 20, 2019, at the IPC Pavilion in Wellington, Florida

Group One
Team	Won	Lost
Aspen	3	0
Cessna	2	1
Santa Clara	1	2
SD Farms	0	3

Group Two
Team	Won	Lost
Iconica	3	0
Equuleus	2	1
Coca-Cola	1	2
La Indiana	0	3

Group Three
Team	Won	Lost
Las Monjitas	3	0
Daily Racing Form	2	1
Park Place	1	2
Old Hickory Bourbon	0	3

Group Four
Team	Won	Lost
Pilot	3	0
Tonkawa	2	1
Postage Stamp Farm	1	2
Stable Door	0	3

== Final stage ==
Quarterfinal brackets were determined by group winners who drew from the pool of second place teams from outside their own group.

Quarterfinals
Iconica	9
Cessna	8
Pilot	14
Daily Racing Form	10
Las Monjitas	8
Equuleus	4
Aspen	11
Tonkawa	12

Semifinals
Iconica	6
Pilot	13
Las Monjitas	14
Tonkawa	12

Finals
Pilot	12
Las Monjitas	7

== Team Rosters ==
Team	Position 1 (Hcap)	Position 2 (Hcap)	Position 3 (Hcap)	Position 4 (Hcap)	Team Hcap	Substitute A (Hcap)	Substitute B (Hcap)
Aspen	Tomas Schwenke (2)	Polito Pieres (10)	Lucas James (7)	Stewart Armstrong (3)	22		
Cessna	Chip Campbell (2)	Felipe Marquez (6)	Ezequiel M. Ferrario (7)	Felipe Viana (6)	21	Eduardo Novillo Astrada (8)	
Coca-Cola	Gillian Johnston (2)	Julian de Lusarreta (8)	Nacho Novillo Astrada (8)	Steve Krueger (4)	22		
Daily Racing Form	Jared Zenni (6)	Agustin Obregon (6)	Santiago Cernadas (6)	Geronimo Obregon (4)	22		
Equuleus	Joe DiMenna (0)	Iñaki Laprida (7)	Cristian "Magoo" Laprida (8)	Mariano Gonzalez (7)	22	Milo Dorignac (0)	
Iconica	Maureen Brennan (1)	Mariono "Peke" Gonzalez Jr (5)	Sebastian Merlos (9)	Matias Magrini (7)	22		
La Indiana	Michael Bickford (2)	Facundo Obregon (6)	Jeff Hall (7)	Tomas Garcia del Rio (7)	22	Bautista Ortiz de Urbina (6)	
Las Monjitas	Camilo Bautista (0)	Francisco Elizalde (8)	Matt Coppola (4)	Hilario Ulloa (10)	22		
Old Hickory Bourbon	Will Johnston (2)	Jason Crowder (6)	Miguel Novillo Astrada (9)	Stevie Orthwein (4)	21	Sugar Erskine (6)	
Park Place	Andrey Borodin (0)	Juan Britos (8)	Nico Pieres (9)	Lucas Díaz Alberdi (5)	22		
Pilot	Matias Gonzalez (3)	Gonzalo Pieres Jr. (9)	Facundo Pieres (10)	Curtis Pilot (0)	22		
Postage Stamp Farm	Annabelle Gundlach (0)	Lerín Zubiaurre (8)	Mariano Aguerre (8)	Joaquin Panelo (6)	22	Joaquin Pittaluga (8)	Leon Schwenke (0)
Santa Clara	Nico Escobar (3)	Nino Obregon (6)	Ignacio "Cubi" Toccalino (8)	Luis Escobar (5)	22	Benjamin Avendaño (3)	
SD Farms	Sayyu Dantata (2)	Cesar "Peco" Polledo (6)	Juan "Tito" Ruiz Guiñazu (8)	Jesus "Pelon" Escapite (6)	22	Timmy Dutta (2)	
Stable Door	Henry Porter (3)	Santino Magrini (4)	Victorino Ruiz Jorba (6)	Santiago Toccalino (8)	21		
Tonkawa	Jeff Hildebrand (0)	Agustin "Tincho" Merlos (8)	Guillermo "Sapo" Caset (10)	Sterling Giannico (4)	22	Malia Bryan (0)	

== Team statistics ==
Team	Matches Played	Matches Won	Winning Avg	Matches Lost	Goals scored	Avg Goals Per Game	Goals Against	Avg Goals Against Per Game	Avg +/- Per Game
Aspen	4	3	0.75	1	50	12.5	42	10.5	2.00
Cessna	4	2	0.50	2	35	8.75	40	10	-1.25
Coca-Cola	3	1	0.33	2	29	9.67	36	12	-2.33
Daily Racing Form	4	2	0.50	2	41	10.25	44	11	-0.75
Equuleus	4	2	0.50	2	34	8.5	35	8.75	-0.25
Iconica	5	4	0.80	1	43	8.6	41	8.2	0.40
La Indiana	3	0	0.00	3	27	9	31	10.33	-1.33
Las Monjitas	6	5	0.00	1	62	10.33	55	9.17	1.16
Old Hickory Bourbon	3	0	0.00	3	30	10	32	10.67	-0.67
Park Place	3	1	0.33	2	34	11.33	36	12	-0.67
Pilot	6	6	1.00	0	75	12.5	45	7.5	5.00
Postage Stamp Farm	3	1	0.33	2	27	9	28	9.33	-0.33
Santa Clara	3	1	0.33	2	34	11.33	29	9.67	1.66
SD Farms	3	0	0.00	3	24	8	34	11.33	-3.33
Stable Door	3	0	0.00	3	23	7.67	45	15	-7.33
Tonkawa	5	3	0.60	2	61	12.2	53	10.6	1.60

== Individual Scorers ==
Player	Team	Position	Games played	Goals	Goals/Game
Facundo Pieres	Pilot	3	6	35	5.83
Francisco Elizalde	Las Monjitas	2	6	32	5.33
Guillermo "Sapo" Caset	Tonkawa	3	5	35	6.20
Pablo "Polito" Pieres	Aspen	2	4	25	6.25
Gonzalo Pieres Jr.	Pilot	2	6	25	4.17
Mariano Gonzalez Jr.	Iconica	2	5	24	4.80
Nicolas Pieres	Park Place	3	3	20	6.67
Hilario Ulloa	Las Monjitas	4	6	20	3.33
Ignacio "Cubi" Toccalino	Santa Clara	3	3	19	6.33
Mariano Gonzalez	Equuleus	4	4	17	4.25
Agustin "Tincho" Merlos	Tonkawa	2	5	14	2.80
Sebastian Merlos	Iconica	3	5	13	2.60
Felipe Viana	Cessna	4	4	13	3.25
Santiago Toccalino	Stable Door	4	3	12	4.00
Valerio "Lerin" Zubiaurre	Postage Stamp Farm	2	3	12	4.00
Jared Zenni	Daily Racing Form	1	4	11	2.75
Ignacio Novillo Astrada	Coca Cola	3	3	11	3.67
Matias Gonzalez	Pilot	1	6	11	1.83
Agustin Obregon	Daily Racing Form	2	4	10	2.50
Felipe Marquez	Cessna	2	4	10	2.50
Stewart Armstrong	Aspen	4	4	10	2.50
Geronimo Obregon	Daily Racing Form	4	4	9	2.25
Julian De Lusarreta	Coca Cola	2	3	9	3.00
Cristian "Magoo" Laprida	Equuleus	3	4	9	2.25
Juan Britos	Park Place	2	3	9	3.00
Ezequiel M. Ferrario (Note: Substituted by another player in one game. Player's team played 4 games, but this player participated in 3.)	Cessna	3	3	9	3.00
Miguel Novillo Astrada	Old Hickory Bourbon	3	3	9	3.00
Jeff Hall	La Indiana	3	3	9	3.00

== Game Scores ==
Game 1 March 27, 2019 3:00pm Field: IPC Field 3
	1	2	3	4	5	6	T
Coca Cola	1	1	3	3	2	2	12
La Indiana	3	2	1	0	0	4	10
Bautista O. de Urbina replaced Facundo Obregon
Goals Coca Cola: I. Novillo Astrada 6, J. Lusarreta 4, G. Johnston 2 Goals La Indiana: J. Hall 3, T. Garcia Del Rio 3, B.O. de Urbina 3, M. Bickford 1
(yellow card) Ignacio Novillo Astrada

Game 2 March 28, 2019 10:00 am Field: Isla Carroll West
	1	2	3	4	5	6	T
Postage Stamp Farm	1	0	1	2	2	2	8
Tonkawa	1	4	1	2	1	1	10
J. Pittaluga replaced M. Aguerre; L Schwenke replaced A. Gundlach
Goals Postage: V. Zubiaurre 4, L. Schwenke 2, J. Panelo 1, J. Pittaluga 1 Goals Tonkawa: G. Caset 7, J. Hildebrand 2, A. Merlos 1

Game 3 March 28, 2019 4:00pm Field: IPC Field 4
	1	2	3	4	5	6	T
SD Farms	2	0	0	0	2	2	6
Santa Clara	1	4	2	2	2	2	13
Benjamin Avendano replaced Nicolas Escobar
Goals SD Farms: J. Escapite 3, J.R. Guiñazu 3 Goals Santa Clara: I. Toccalino 6, L. Escobar 3, M. Obregon 2, B. Avendaño 2
(yellow card) Juan Ruiz Guiñazu

Game 4 March 29, 2019 10:00 am Field: IPC Field 5
	1	2	3	4	5	6	T
Iconica	0	3	1	3	0	1	8
Equuleus	1	2	0	1	0	1	5
Milo Dorignac replaced Joe DiMenna
Goals Iconica: Mariano Gonzalez Jr. 7, Sebastian Merlos 1 Goals Equuleus: Cristian Laprida 2, Mariano Gonzalez 2, Ignacio Laprida 1

Game 5 March 29, 2019 4:00pm Field: Isla Carroll East
	1	2	3	4	5	6	T
Old Hickory Bourbon	2	2	1	3	1	2	11
Park Place	2	3	0	3	3	2	13
Sugar Erskine replaced Jason Crowder
Goals Old Hick Bourb: M. N. Astrada 3, S. Orthwein 3, S Erskine 3, W. Johnston 2 Goals Park Place: N. Pieres 8, J. Britos 4, L. Diaz Alberdi 1
(yellow card) Miguel Novilla Astrada

Game 6 March 30, 2019 10:00 am Field: IPC Field 3
	1	2	3	4	5	6	T
Stable Door	0	1	0	2	0	3	6
Pilot	4	1	2	3	4	1	15
Goals Stable Door: Santiago Toccalino 5, Santino Magrini 1 Goals Pilot: Gonzalo Pieres 6, Facundo Pieres 5, Matias Gonzalez 4

Game 7 March 31, 2019 10:00am Field: Isla Carroll West
	1	2	3	4	5	6	OT	T
Las Monjitas	0	2	2	1	0	3	1	9
Daily Racing Form	1	1	1	0	2	3	0	8
Goals Las Monjitas: Francisco Elizalde 7, Matt Coppola 2 Goals Daily Racing Form: Jared Zenni 4, Agustin Obregon 2
(yellow card) Agustin Obregon

Game 8 March 31, 2019 3:00pm Field: IPC Field 1
	1	2	3	4	5	6	T
Cessna	3	1	0	2	2	0	8
Aspen	1	2	5	1	2	3	14
Eduardo N. Astrada replaced Ezequiel Martinez Ferrario
Goals Cessna: Felipe Viana 5, Felipe Marquez 2, Chip Campbell 1 Goals Aspen: Polito Pieres 8, Stewart Armstrong 5
(yellow card) Felipe Viana

Game 9 April 2, 2019 10:00am Field: Isla Carroll East
	1	2	3	4	5	6	T
Coca Cola	2	2	2	1	1	0	8
Iconica	1	2	1	2	1	5	12
Goals Coca Cola: J. De Lusarreta 3, Steve Krueger 3, I. Novillo Astrada 2 Goals Iconica: Mariano Gonzalo Jr 9, Matias Magrini 2, Sebastian Merlos 1
(yellow card) Mariano Gonzalo Jr.

Game 10 April 3, 2019 10:00am Field: Isla Carroll West
	1	2	3	4	5	6	T
Tonkawa	2	0	3	2	1	2	10
Pilot	3	1	2	2	1	2	11
Malia Bryan replaced Jeff Hildebrand
Goals Tonkawa: Guillermo Caset 4, Agustin Merlos 4, M. Bryan 1, S. Giannico 1 Goals Pilot: Facundo Pieres 6, Gonzalo Pieres 4, Matias Gonzales 1
(yellow card) Guillermo Caset

Game 11 April 3, 2019 4:00pm Field: IPC 4
	1	2	3	4	5	6	T
Postage Stamp Farm	3	3	2	2	1	2	13
Stable Door	2	1	0	3	0	2	8
Leon Schwenke replaced Annabelle Gundlach
Goals Postage Stamp: V. Zubiaurre 7, M. Aguerre 4, J. Panelo, L. Schwenke 1 Goals Stable Door: Santiago Toccalino 4, Victor Ruiz Jorba 3
(yellow card) Santino Magrini

Game 12 April 4, 2019 10:00am Field: IPC 5
	1	2	3	4	5	6	T
SD Farms	1	2	2	0	2	1	8
Cessna	1	1	2	1	3	1	9
Goals SD Farms: J. Escapite 3, Juan R. Guinazu 2, Timmy Dutta 2, C. Polledo 1 Goals Cessna: F. Marquez 4, F. Viana 3, Ezequiel Ferrario 1, Chip Campbell 1
(yellow card) Felipe Marquez
