= Owen Rinehart =

American polo player

Owen Rinehart is an American polo player.

He won the U.S. Open handicap in 1982 and the U.S. Open Polo Championship in 1986. He also won the Gold Cup, C.V. Whitney Cup, the Monty Waterbury Cup, the America Cup, the Hall of Fame and World Cups, as well as the East Coast Open. He also won the Coronation Cup in 1987 and the Westchester Cup in 1992. His pony Hill Country Slim won the Hartman Trophy in 1986.

He was inducted into the Museum of Polo and Hall of Fame on February 13, 2009. In 2012, he appeared on a television special about polo on 60 Minutes.
