= Charles Smith (polo) =

American polo player

Charles Smith was an American polo player.

== Biography ==
Charles Smith was a seven-goal player. He won the U.S. Open Polo Championship five times. He played on the U.S. Team for the Camacho Cups in 1976 and 1981, and the Cup of the Americas in 1979. He won three C.V. Whitney Cups, two Gold Cups, two Butler Handicaps, and eight 20 Goal or Silver Cups. He won Southwest Intra-Circuit Championship six times and the National Inter-Circuit Championship in 1972.

He received the Hugo Dalmar Award from the United States Polo Association in 1999. He was inducted into the Museum of Polo and Hall of Fame on February 20, 2004.
