= Aiken Polo Club =

Polo club in Aiken, South Carolina, USA

The Aiken Polo Club is a polo club in Aiken, South Carolina.

== Location ==
It is located at 240-399 Mead Avenue in Aiken, South Carolina, 29801. It is two blocks away from the Aiken Thoroughbred Racing Hall of Fame and Museum, the Rye Patch Estate and the Hopelands Gardens.

== History ==
The club was established in 1882. That year, Colonel Clarence Sutherland Wallace (1851–1903) of the Havemeyer Sugar Company organized the first match. He played, and the other players were William Chaffee, Judge William Quitman Davis, George and William Eustis (1862–1921), a Hostetter, W.R. Lincoln and James Oakley.

Thomas Hitchcock, Sr. (1860–1941), who wintered in Aiken, was one of the early players. Other players included Harry Payne Whitney (1872–1930), Devereux Milburn (1881–1942), Pete Bostwick (1909–1982), James P. Mills (1909–1987), brothers Elbridge T. Gerry, Sr. (1909–1999) and Robert L. Gerry, Jr. (1911–1979), brothers Seymour H. Knox III (1926–1996) and Northrup R. Knox (1928–1998), Francis Skiddy von Stade, Sr. (1884–1967) and his son Charles Skiddy von Stade, brothers Stewart Iglehart (1910–1993) and Philip L. B. Iglehart (1913–1993), Alan L. Corey, Jr., and Louis Ezekiel Stoddard (1881–1951).

The club fell in abeyance during the Second World War. However, in 1957, the club celebrated its seventy-fifth anniversary with the Diamond Anniversary Cup. The Aiken team (Charles Leonard, Pete Bostwick, Alan Corey, Jr., and Devereux Milburn) beat the Aurora team (Jack Ivory, Seymour H. Knox II, Seymour H. Knox III and Northrup R. Knox).

In the 1970s, Thomas Biddle, Sr., David Widener and Gene Kneece decided to revive the club.

In 2007, the club president was Charles Bostwick. That year, it celebrated its 125th anniversary.

It is recognized by the United States Polo Association (USPA), the governing body of polo in the United States.
