= William A. Mayer =

American polo player and car dealer

- Born: October 12, 1922; Chicago, Illinois, U.S.
- Died: November 2, 1994 (aged 72); Gulf Stream, Florida U.S.
- Occupation(s): polo player, car dealer
- Spouse: Marilyn
- Children: 2

William A. Mayer (1922-1994) was an American polo player and car dealer.

== Biography ==
Mayer was a "nine-goal" rated polo player. He won the U.S. Open Polo Championship in 1956 and 1959. He also won the Twenty-Goal Championship twice, as well as the Monty Waterbury Cup. He was inducted into the Museum of Polo and Hall of Fame in Lake Worth, Florida on March 3, 1995.

Following his polo playing career, Mayer served as president of Mayer Motors, an automobile dealership in Fort Lauderdale, Florida, from 1965 to 1974.

He had two sons, Robert M. Mayer and William A. Mayer Jr.
