= Stephen M. Gose =

American oilman and polo player

Stephen M. Gose is an American oilman and polo player.

== Biography ==
=== Oil ===
A Texan, he started two private oil and gas exploration companies, Galaxy Oil and The Exploration Company, focusing on North Texas, the Arkansas-Oklahoma Basin, the Rockies, the Austin Chalk and the Gulf Coast.

Since 1995, he is President of Remtaco Operating, headquartered in Red Lodge, Montana. It focuses on oil and gas exploration in the Williston Basin, the Powder River Basin, the Uinta Basin, and the Piceance Basin.

=== Polo ===
He won the U.S. Open Polo Championship in 1977 (with William R. Linfoot, Guillermo Gracida, Jr. and Harold A. Barry), 1979 (with the same players) and 1982 (with Guillermo Gracida, Jr., Carlos Gracida and Ruben Gracida). He also won two Gold Cups and three Silver Cup. He built and owned the Retama Polo Club in San Antonio, Texas. He was inducted into the Museum of Polo and Hall of Fame in Lake Worth, Florida on February 7, 1997.

His son, Thomas Gose, won the U.S. Open Polo Championship in 1984 and 1986. His other son, Matt Gose, also lived in Red Lodge, MT, and serves as Vice President of Exploration of Remtaco Operating.
