= Charles Roark =

Charles Roark may refer to:

- Charles W. Roark (1887–1929), U.S. Representative from Kentucky
- Charles Thomas Irvine Roark (1895–1939), English polo player
