= Bart Evans (polo) =

American polo player

Bart Evans is an American polo player.

== Biography ==
Bart Evans was born in Mission, Kansas. He first played in Kansas City at the age of 18.

In 1972, 1975, and 1976, he won the Butler Handicap. The same year, he won the US Handicap C.V. Whitney Cup, and in 1983, the U.S. Open Polo Championship. In 1985, he won the Monty Waterbury Cup. In 1988, he won the Westchester Cup against Australia. In 1988 and 1989, he won the US Handicap C.V. Whitney Cup again. He also won the American Cup (formerly 16 goals), the 1993 Silver Cup, the Pacific Coast Open and the International Gold Cup, and two World Polo Championships.

He lives on a ranch in Midland, Texas with his wife Nina and their two sons. His son, Robert Evans, played with him at the International Gold Cup. His second son, Gene Evans, teaches polo at the Meadowbrook Polo Club.

He was inducted into the Museum of Polo and Hall of Fame on February 17, 2001.
