= Summerfield Johnston Jr. =

American businessman and polo player

- Born: August 28, 1932 (age 93); McDonald, Tennessee, U.S.
- Education: University of Virginia
- Occupations: Businessman, polo player
- Spouses: Lavinia Dabney Neill Johnston; Gil Johnston
- Children: Lavinia Johnston; Summerfield Johnston III; Gillian Johnston
- Parent: Summerfield Johnston Sr.

Summerfield Johnston Jr. (born August 28, 1932), aka Skey Johnston, is an American businessman and polo player. He served as chairman of the board and chief executive officer of Coca-Cola Enterprises from 1991 to 2001.

== Early life ==
Summerfield Johnston Jr. was born in 1932 and grew up on the 4,000-acre Bendabout Farm in McDonald, Bradley County, Tennessee. His grandfather was James F. Johnston, the founder of the Coca-Cola Bottling Company, the first Coca-Cola franchisee. His father, Summerfield Johnston Sr., worked for the family business. He graduated from the University of Virginia, where he played polo in 1951.

== Career ==
He joined the board of directors of the Coca-Cola Bottling Company in 1959. In 1991, he merged it with Coca-Cola Enterprises. He served as its chairman and CEO from 1991 to 2001.

He is a former board member of SunTrust Banks and SunTrust Bank of Chattanooga, N.A.He sits on the board of trustees of the Center for the Study of the Presidency and Congress and the University of Chattanooga Foundation.

== Polo ==
Johnston is a left-handed polo player. In the 1950s, he organized polo matches on his family farm in McDonald, Tennessee. He later founded the Chattanooga Polo Club, later known as the Bendabout Polo Club. He served as the long-time president of the Gulfstream Polo Club in Lake Worth, Florida. He served as vice president of the United States Polo Association from 1979 to 1989, president from 1980 to 1984 and as chairman from 1984 to 1988, and still sits on its board as a governor-at-large. He owns the Flying H ranch in Big Horn, Wyoming, home to the Flying H Polo Club, and the Everglades Polo Club in Wellington, Florida.

In 1982, he was awarded the Hugo Dalmar Trophy for exemplary sportsmanship. On February 17, 2001, he was inducted into the Museum of Polo and Hall of Fame. He is a proponent of the return of polo to the Olympic Games.

== Personal life ==
His British-born wife, Gil Johnston, is Vice President of the Polo Training Foundation. His late son was Summerfield Johnston III, a renowned polo player who served as Vice President of Coca-Cola Enterprises. His daughter, Gillian Johnston, is also a polo player and serves as governor-at-large of the United States Polo Association.
