= Cecil Smith (polo) =

American rancher and polo player

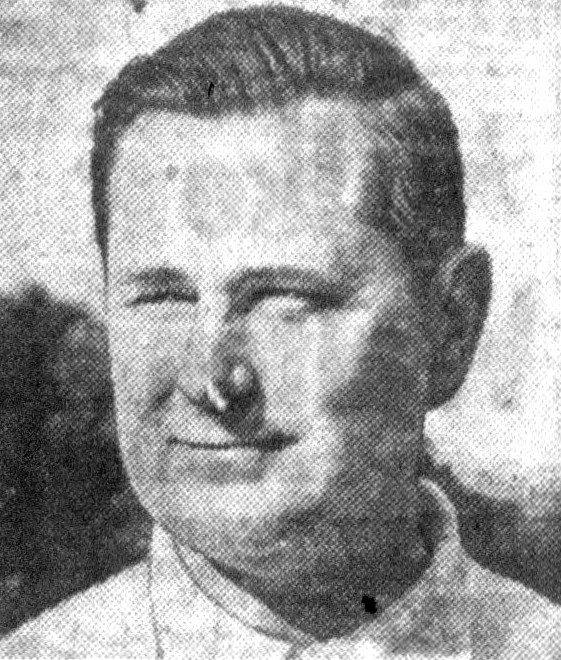
- Smith, circa 1950
- Born: February 14, 1904; Llano, Texas
- Died: January 21, 1999 (aged 94); Boerne, Texas
- Occupation(s): Rancher, polo player
- Spouse: Mary (Miller) Smith
- Children: Charles Smith; Sidney Smith

Cecil Smith (February 14, 1904 – January 21, 1999) was an American rancher and polo player.

== Biography ==
=== Early life ===
Cecil Smith was born on the Moss Ranch near Llano, Texas, on February 14, 1904. In his childhood, he won roping prizes in rodeos.

=== Career ===
In 1924, he started playing polo while working for George Miller, a horse trader in Austin, Texas. He also played alongside Albert Buckman Wharton Jr. at his El Ranchito Polo Club on his Waggoner Ranch. He later played polo with Will Rogers, Darryl Zanuck, Walt Disney and Reginald Denny.

He was a ten-goal player from 1938 to 1962 -which makes him the American with the longest record to hold the ten-goal status. He often competed at the Meadow Brook Polo Club in Westbury, New York. He won the Monty Waterbury Cup in 1930 and the U.S. Open Polo Championship five times. He played with the U.S.A. team against Mexico three times. (Quote from New York Times article dated Feb.14, 1999, "Then, starting in 1938, he began a string of 26 years, 25 consecutively (1938-62), in which he was a 10-goal player".)

He owned a 100-acre ranch in Boerne, Texas, where he rode and trained horses.

=== Personal life ===
He married Mary Miller in 1935. Their sons, Charles and Sidney, are polo players.

=== Death ===
He died on January 21, 1999, in Boerne.

== Legacy ==
He was inducted into the Museum of Polo and Hall of Fame in Lake Worth, Florida, on April 6, 1990.
