= John T. Oxley (polo) =

American businessman and polo player

- Born: July 26, 1909; Coal County, Oklahoma, USA
- Died: September 19, 1996 (aged 87)
- Resting place: Memorial Park Cemetery; Tulsa, Oklahoma
- Occupations: Oxley Resources, LLC, Royal Palm Polo Club, Greenhill Farm
- Spouse(s): Mary Katheryn Yetter (1912-1987)
- Children: Thomas Edward (1944-2009), John C., Mary Jane
- Parent(s): Moses Edward Oxley (1874-1950); Sallie Eva Cochran (1880-1962)
- Honors: United States Polo Hall of Fame (1994); Tulsa Historical Society Hall of Fame (2003)

John Thurman Oxley (July 26, 1909 - September 19, 1996) was an American businessman and polo player.

== Biography ==
=== Early life ===
John Thurman Oxley was born on a cattle farm near Bromide, Oklahoma in 1909. He moved to Tulsa, Oklahoma at the age of seventeen.

=== Career ===
In 1935, he started his career at Warren Petroleum, and by 1948 he was secretary to the corporation. He started his own company, Texas Natural Gasoline Corporation and sold it in 1961 to start an exploration company, Oxley Petroleum, with his older son, John C. Oxley. They specialized in natural gas. He sold it to the Allied Corporation (itself later acquired by Honeywell).

=== Polo ===
He took up polo at the age of 46. He won two U.S. Open Polo Championships, the USPA Rolex Gold Cup and Silver Cup, the Monty Waterbury Cup, the Sunshine League many times, and twenty-seven medium-goal championships. He won the International Gold Cup at 83, the oldest player to do so.

He owned the Royal Palm Polo Club in Boca Raton, Florida. He also owned Greenhill Farm, one of the largest commercial producers of polo ponies in the United States, near Owasso, Oklahoma.

=== Legacy ===
He is a 2003 honoree of the Hall of Fame of the Tulsa Historical Society. He was inducted into the Museum of Polo and Hall of Fame on March 17, 1994. The Mary K. Oxley Nature Center, a wildlife preserve in Mohawk Park, Tulsa, is named for his late wife.

=== Personal life ===
He was married to his wife, Mary, from 1935 until her death in 1987. They went horseriding and played polo together. They spent the winter season living in Delray Beach, Florida and the rest of the year at their home in Tulsa. One of their sons, Thomas, also played polo, and nearly died from a brain stem injury in 1968, when he lay unconscious for 31 days. They had another son, John C. Oxley, also a polo player, and a daughter, Mary Jane Tritsch.
