= Summerfield Johnston III =

American businessman and polo player

- Born: January 8, 1954; Chattanooga, Tennessee, US
- Died: April 5, 2007 (aged 53); Palm Beach, Florida, US
- Education: Eckerd College
- Occupations: Businessman, polo player
- Spouse: Leslie Buttram Johnston
- Children: 1
- Parent(s): Summerfield Johnston, Jr. Gil Johnston
- Relatives: Gillian Johnston (sister)

Summerfield Johnston III, a.k.a. Skeeter Johnston, (January 8, 1954 – April 5, 2007) was an American businessman and polo player.

== Early life ==
Skeeter Johnson was born in Chattanooga, Tennessee, on January 8, 1954. He attended Bright School grammar school and Baylor School in Chattanooga. He graduated from Eckerd College in St Petersburg, Florida. His great-grandfather was James F. Johnston, the founder of the Coca-Cola Bottling Company, the first Coca-Cola franchiser. His father, Summerfield Johnston, Jr., served as the former chairman and CEO of the Coca-Cola Enterprises. He had three sisters, Katherine Johnston Tudor, Lavinia Johnston, Gillian Johnston and one brother, Robert Johnston.

== Career ==
He joined his family's Coca-Coca Bottling Company and served as President of its food and restaurant division and of its Australian subsidiary, WinPac Ltd. He was then President of the Coca-Cola Bottling Company Northwest in Minneapolis, Minnesota and of Coca-Cola Bottling Company of Cleveland, Tennessee. In the aftermath of the 1991 merger of the Johnston Coca-Cola Bottling Group with Coca-Cola Enterprises, he served as Vice President of Human Resources, Senior Vice President and President of the Eastern North American Group, responsible for bottling operations in the eastern United States, and Executive Vice President and Chief Strategy and Business Development Officer. He retired from Coca-Cola Enterprises in February 2004, and served on its board of directors from 2004 to 2007.

He sat on the Boards of Directors of the Krystal restaurant chain, MetalTek International, a specialty metal casting company, SunTrust Bank of Chattanooga, N. A., Southern Screens Entertainment, a real estate and multi-screen cinema house company in Argentina, and e-Skye Solutions, a distributor of channel management software. He sat on the Board of Trustees of the Coca-Cola Scholars Foundation.

== Polo ==
He played polo for thirty-five years. He was a governor-at-large of the United States Polo Association. He was a co-founder of the North American Polo League in 2005. He was a principal partner of the Flying H Polo Club in Big Horn, Wyoming. He was a patron and a player of the Skeeterville team. He was Captain of the teams that won the $100,000 Gold Cup, a 26-goal tournament, in 1988; the Cartier International Open, in 1982; the USPA Heritage Cup twice; and the 2003 Hall of Fame Cup. His teams were three times runner up in the United States Open Polo Tournament.

== Personal life ==
He was married to Leslie Buttram Johnston, and they had a daughter, Louisa. They lived in Palm Beach, Florida and Big Horn, Wyoming.

== Death ==
He died of an injury involving a horse while preparing for the 2007 Stanford U.S. Open championships at the Palm Beach International Polo Club on April 5, 2007.
