= Clarence C. Combs Jr. =

American polo player

Clarence C. Combs Jr., a.k.a. Buddy Combs, was an American polo player.

== Biography ==
He graduated from the Pennsylvania Military Academy, now known as Widener University. He then attended the Cornell University College of Veterinary Medicine. He practised as a veterinarian in New Jersey.

In 1937, while a student at Cornell, he won the Intercollegiate Championship in 1937. He went to on win the 1939 Junior Championship, east–west title in 1951, the 1951 and 1953 National Arena Championships. He also won the Monty Waterbury Cup twice, in 1947 and 1956. In 1951, he became a ten-goal polo player.

He was inducted into the Museum of Polo and Hall of Fame on March 20, 1992.
