= Geoffrey Kent =

Founder of luxury travel firm Abercrombie & Kent

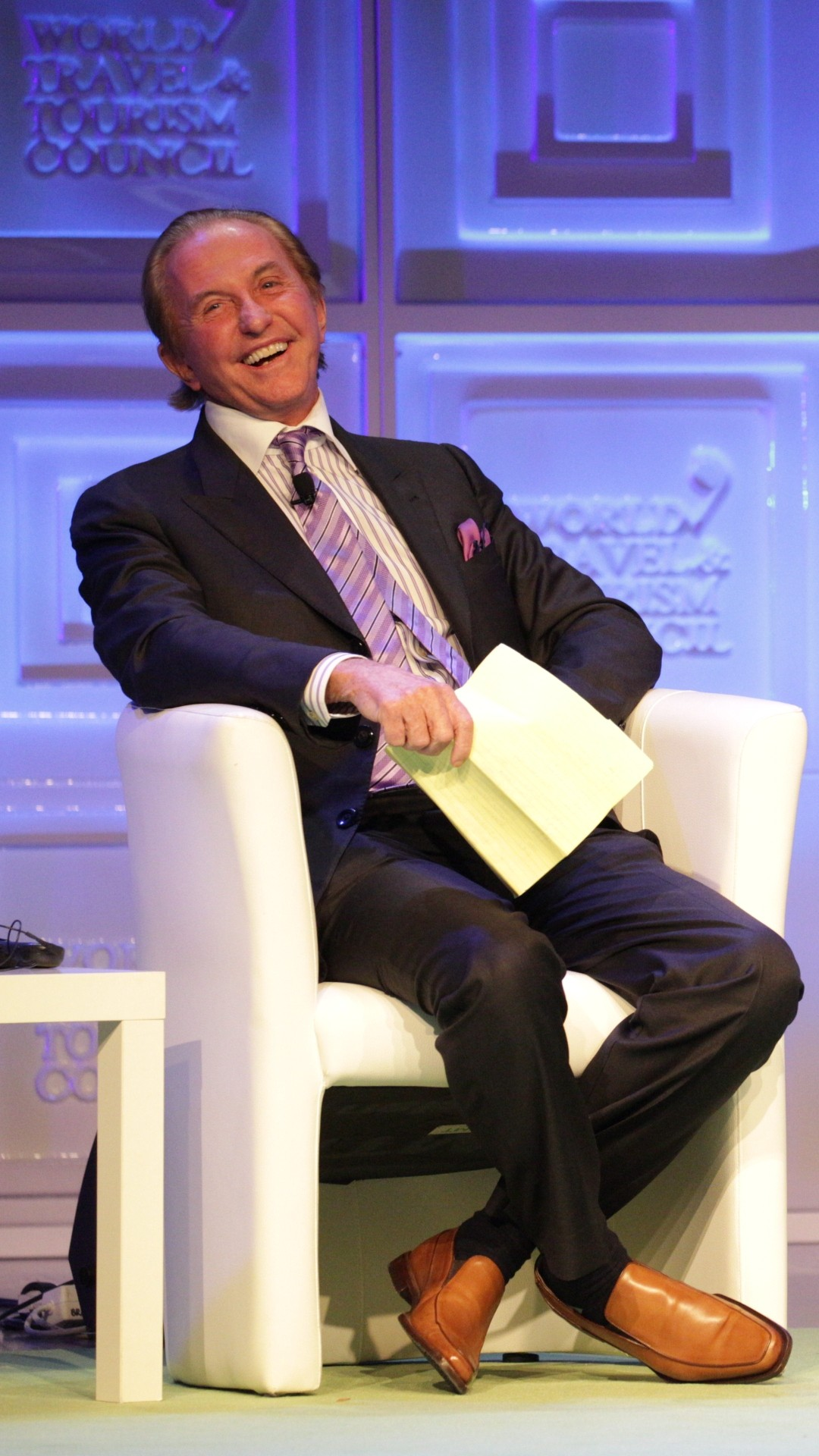
Kent in 2015

Geoffrey JW Kent (born 14 July 1942) is the Founder and Chairman Emeritus of Abercrombie & Kent, an international luxury and adventure travel company. He is credited with introducing the first luxury photographic African safari in 1962.

== Early life ==
Geoffrey Kent was born on 14 July 1942 while his parents, Colonel John and Valerie Kent, were on safari in Zambia.

Kent attended the Duke of York School in Nairobi and then the Royal Military Academy at Sandhurst. He saw service in Bahrain, Kuwait, and Malta.

== Career ==
While in the British Army, he joined his parents in founding Abercrombie & Kent. Influenced by his time in the military, Kent repositioned the safari experience as a "hunt with a camera, not with a gun". He introduced the first mobile tented safaris with refrigeration that made it possible to have fresh meat, fruit, vegetables and ice in the bush.

By 1967, Kent's parents retired and he transformed Abercrombie & Kent from a service providing luxury safari camps and lodges to a more general luxury travel service.

Kent pioneered travel by private jet with The Royal Air Tour in 1989, having been the first to feature the Concorde Supersonic Jet with British Airways.

== Awards and honours ==
Kent is a founding member of the World Travel and Tourism Council. He served as a Chairman of the council for 6 years. In 2021 he was awarded the Global Icon Award and made an Honorary Member of WTTC. He was inducted into the British Travel and Hospitality Industry Hall of Fame on April 17, 2012, for inventing the concept of experiential travel. Kent received a Lifetime Achievement Award at the Travel Weekly Readers Choice Awards in 2014.

Kent has been appointed the Honorary Consul of the Republic of Kenya to Monaco.

== Television ==
To the Ends of the Earth with Geoffrey Kent aired on the USA Network in 1994 with Lauren Hutton in Papua New Guinea and James Brolin in Kenya. The series received two nominations for the Cable ACE Award.

== Philanthropy ==
In 1982 Kent and then wife Jorie Butler Kent founded Abercrombie & Kent Philanthropy, a non-profit organization for protecting ecosystems and wildlife that also supports local communities. It was recognized by the World Travel and Tourism Council's Tourism for Tomorrow Awards, Condė Nast Traveler with their World Savers Award for leadership in social responsibility, and by Travel + Leisure with their Global Vision Award for Leadership in Philanthropic Travel.

== Personal life ==
He had one son with first wife, Andrea Joss. In the 1970s, he began working with Jorie Ford Butler of Oak Brook, Illinois, to expand Abercrombie & Kent in the United States. They married in 1978 but later divorced. He married Otavia Jardim in 2010, and they have two children.

Kent was a player as Captain of the Rolex/Abercrombie & Kent team polo team, winning the U.S. Open Polo Championship twice, the U.S. Gold Cup, the Cartier International, and the World Open Championship. He served as captain and patron of the Windsor Park polo team, on which he played with HM King Charles III. He was The Founder of Windsor in Vero Beach, one of Florida’s most exclusive real estate developments, designed by the renowned New Urbanist town planners and architects André Duany and Elizabeth Plater-Zyberk.
