= Robert Skene (polo player) =

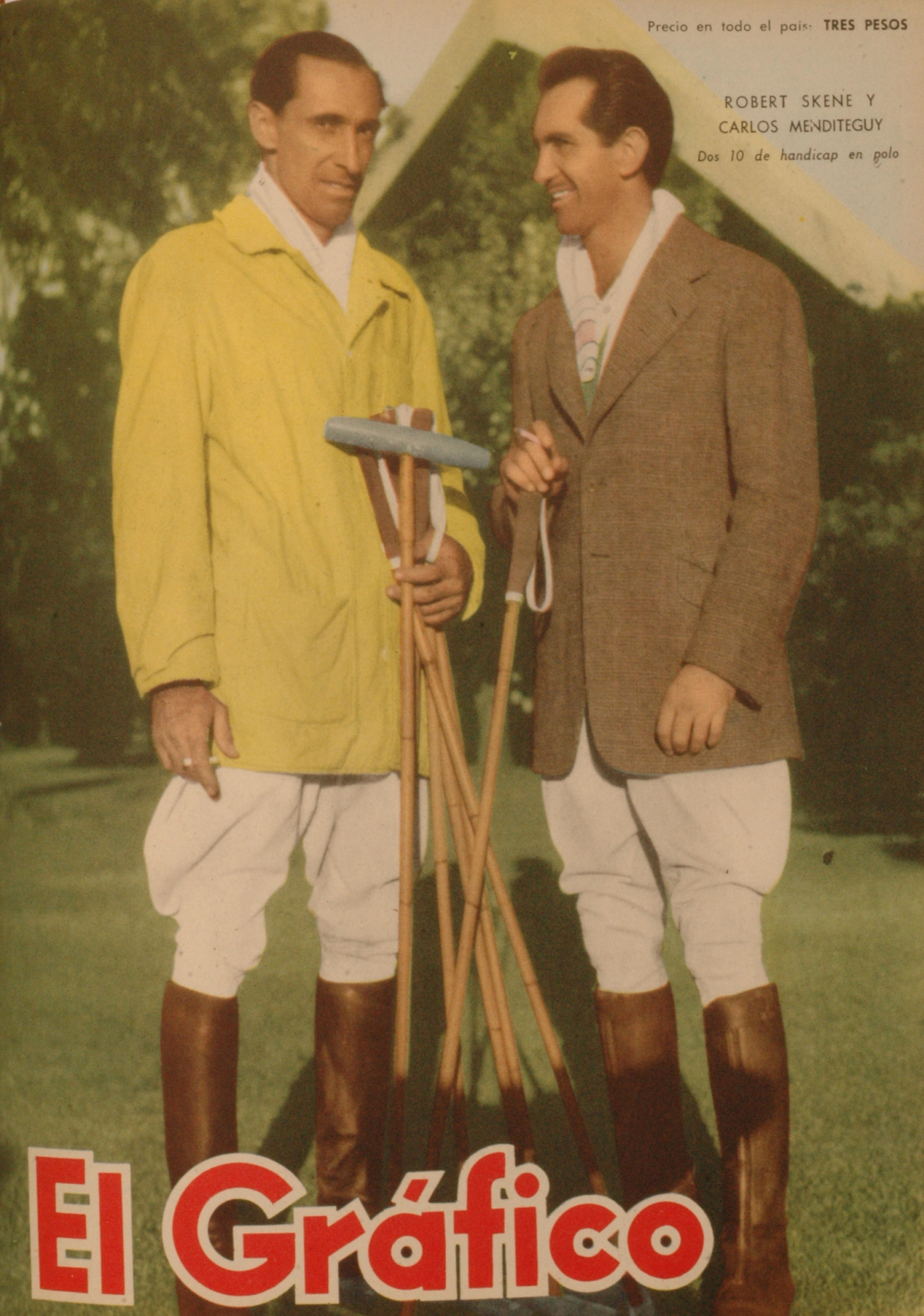
Skene & Carlos Menditeguy - El Gráfico, 1951.

Charles Robertson Skene (26 May 1914 – 24 August 1997), commonly known as Robert or Bob and nicknamed Hurricane Bob, was an Australian 10-goal polo player. He was a founding inductee of the Australian Polo Federation Hall of Fame, the Sport Australia Hall of Fame and the U.S. Museum of Polo and Hall of Fame.

== Biography ==
Skene was born in Assam, India to an Australian tea planter, Curtis Skene. His father was a distinguished polo player, becoming an eight-goal player in 1929. Charles Skene began his polo-playing career playing country club polo in Australia with his father and friends.

He was a two-goal player at 18. In 1937 he was on the Ashton Brothers Australian team that won the Champion Cup at the Hurlingham Club in London. At 25 he received a nine-goal rating playing for England vs. the United States in the Westchester Cup on Long Island, New York. Skene remained in the United States after the match, working in the war relief effort in the Bundles for Britain campaign. He played no polo until 1949.

Wanting to contribute more to the war effort, he soon joined the Indian army, becoming an officer in a Gurkhas regiment. In February 1942 he was posted to Malaya, then taken prisoner by the Japanese at the fall of Singapore the same month. He was held in Singapore's infamous Changi Prison for 3½ years. In late 1946 Skene was discharged from the army; he became a racing steward in Kuala Lumpur, Malaya.

In 1949 he was invited to play for England again, vs. Argentina in Argentina. The Argentines initially gave him a handicap of six goals, but soon raised that to nine goals. In 1950, he was hired by Russell E. Havenstrite to manage the Beverly Hills Polo Club in Beverly Hills, California. At the end of the 1950 season he was raised to a ten-goal ranking (the maximum possible).

He played in eight U.S. Open Polo Championships, and was on the winning side three times. He retained his ten-goal ranking for 17 years, until the age of 53. In 1954 he became the first foreigner to play for an Argentine team (El Trebol) in an Argentine Open. He was invited to play there again in 1956. Both times he was on the winning team.

In 1960 he moved to Santa Barbara, California, where he became manager of the Santa Barbara Polo Club. In the early 1970s the historic club was in financial difficulty. Membership and patronage had dropped, and property developers were trying to redevelop the polo fields. Skene worked keeping the club afloat, lobbying the county supervisors against development proposals, organizing volunteers, repairing stables, organizing teams and playing, and generating greater interest and a larger membership. He is credited with saving polo in Santa Barbara.

In 1972 and 1973 he made extensive travels around the United States, teaching polo schools at various polo clubs.

In 1988 Skene was inducted into the Sports Australia Hall of Fame and in 1990 he was inducted into the United States Polo Hall of Fame. The Santa Barbara club awards the annual Robert Skene Trophy to twenty-goal tournament winners.

He died on 24 August 1997 in Santa Barbara, California at the age of 83.
