= Sunny Hale =

American polo player

Sunset "Sunny" Hale (December 30, 1968, Carmel, California – February 26, 2017, Norman, Oklahoma) was a professional polo player and one of the few women to play on pro teams consisting almost entirely of men.

In 2000, she was on the winning team in the U.S. Open Polo Championship, becoming the first woman to do so. At the time of the 2000 championship, she outranked 96 percent of players in the world, including men.

Described as "the most famous female polo player in the world", Sunny was active in developing women's polo.

Sunny's mother, Sue Sally Hale, competed as a polo player in the 1950s and '60s disguised as a man and is credited with breaking the gender barrier in the sport.

Sunny Hale was inducted into the National Cowgirl Museum and Hall of Fame in 2012.

== Death ==
Sunny Hale died at age 48 from complications from breast cancer on February 26, 2017.
