= Mike Azzaro =

American polo player

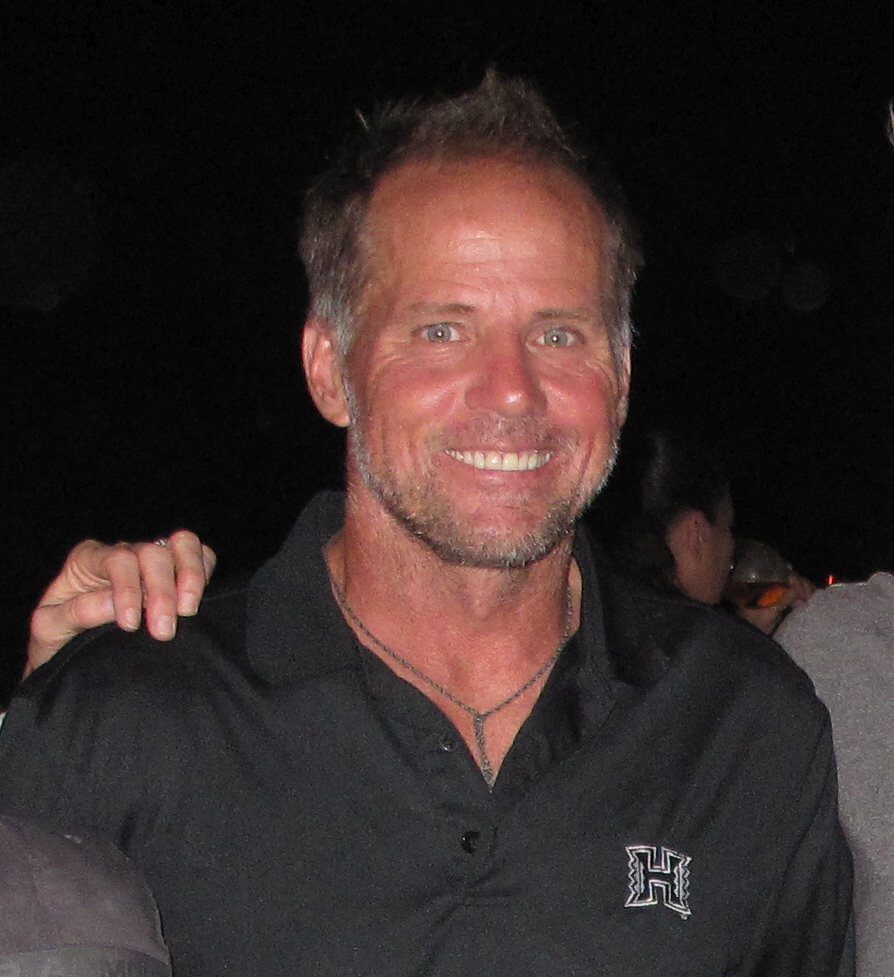
- Occupation: Polo player

Mike Azzaro is an American professional polo player from San Antonio, Texas. Azzaro's current handicap is 6 goals, but he held the sport's highest handicap of 10 goals for over ten years. Azzaro was awarded Polo Magazine's Polo Excellence Award for Young Player of the Year in 1987 and 1990, and the award for Player of the Year in 1994. Known for his aggressive forward style of play, he has always been a crowd favorite. Playing with five-time Player of the Year winner Memo Gracida, they formed one of the most powerful duos in polo. Azzaro and Gracida both reside in Wellington, Florida.

== Biography ==
Azzaro was first awarded the highest handicap in 1994 after reaching the finals of every high goal tournament in the Palm Beach season as well as winning the U.S. Open in California. In 1995 he was lowered back to 9 after the 1994 season and U.S. Open in which teams he was on did not perform well. In 1996 after having a great season he was raised to 10 goals, a rating he held until the mid-2000s.

In 2009, he was to captain the U.S. Team against Mexico in the Camacho Cup. However he had an injury that ended his Florida season. He bounced back in the summer by captaining the Luchese team to one of the three finals of the Santa Barbara season.

Among his many accomplishments and recognitions is the standing ovation he received while playing the Palermo Open in Argentina with the La Mariana team (Sebastian Merlos, Pite Merlos, Milo Fernandez-Araujo) in 1995. While the team lost it further cemented Azzaro as a prominent figure in Polo.

Teams he has played for include the Black Bears, Maple Leafs, Michelob, Tarahumara, Gehache (U.S. Open Winner), Outback (U.S. Open Winner), Isla Carroll (U.S. Open Winner), Pegasus, Templeton, Old Pueblo, Luchese, Evergaldes, Grants Farm Manor (U.S Open Winner), Hanalie Bay, Ellerstina, White Birch, Retama II (U.S. Open Winners), Les Liones, BTA, Red Legs, Zacara, Klentner Ranch.

It had been confirmed that in 2012 Mike Azzaro would form part of the Crab Orchard Polo team. His role on the team will be that of the linchpin third player on a team that includes Adolfo Cambiaso, David "Pelon" Stirling and team captain George Rawlings. In what ultimately disbanded the team and ended up terminating Cambiaso's relationship with Crab Orchard, Mike Azzaro was dropped from the team's lineup. Many believing Cambiaso was not interested in playing with Azzaro. That year saw Azzaro join the Zacara squad that ended up winning the US Open and him winning the MVP. The following year, in a final against Cambia's Valiente team, Mike Azzaro and Zacara (Lyndon Lea, Facundo Pieres and Magoo Laprida) once again won the US Open, further cementing Mike Azzaro's place in high goal polo. In 2011, despite a strong team and high expectations, the Crab Orchard squad of Cambiaso, Rawlings, Hilario Ulloa and South African Nachi du Plesis, failed to be the powerhouse everyone in the polo community expected. In March 2017 he participated at the Iglehart Cup where his team, La Indiana, won 11-4. On October 16, 2017, he was named most valuable player after winning the US Trust Cup at the Buenos Aires Field of the Sundayat Santa Rita Polo Farm and then a week later he was named MVP again for winning 9-8 at the United States Polo Association Fall Classic.
