= Lester Armour III =

American polo player

Lester Armour III, a.k.a. Red Armour, is an American polo player.

== Biography ==
His father, Lester Armour Sr., was a polo player who taught him how to play.

He was a nine-goal player. He played in two Cup of the Americas, two victorious Camacho Cups, and a Coronation Cup. He won a U.S. Handicap, two Gold Cups, three Silver Cups and a North American Cup. He served as a governor and Chairman of the Handicap Committee of the United States Polo Association (USPA). He was inducted into the Museum of Polo and Hall of Fame in Lake Worth, Florida on February 26, 1999.

He is married to Louise Armour.
