= Robert D. Beveridge =

American polo player

Robert D. Beveridge is an American polo player.

== Biography ==
He became a seven-goal player in 1967. He won the U.S. Open Polo Championship in 1957, 1963, 1971 and 1973. His teams recorded titles in the 20-goal Silver Cup in 1954, 1960 and 1961, the Butler National Handicap in 1956, 1957 and 1977, the America Cup in 1966, the Chairman's Cup in 1967 and 1968, and the Inter-Circuit in 1953, 1966 and 1968. He played on the U.S.A. World 30-Goal team that played in Argentina in 1966. He also won the Camacho Cup in 1974 and 1975 and the Benson & Hedges tournament in South Africa in 1974.

He sat on the Board of Governors of the United States Polo Association's Southwest Circuit and as Chairman of the Handicap Committee of the USPA. He was inducted into the Museum of Polo and Hall of Fame on February 17, 2006.

He is the father of Tito's Handmade Vodka founder Tito Beveridge and also father to two young professional entrepreneurs and real estate mogul's Luke Beveridge & William Beveridge
