= W. Ray Harrington Jr. =

American polo player

W. Ray Harrington Jr., a.k.a. "Mr. Inside-Out", was an American polo player.

== Biography ==
W. Ray Harrington Jr. was born in Texas.

He was an eight-goal player. He won seven U.S. Open Polo Championships, in 1956, 1959, 1963, 1966, 1967, 1968 and 1969, including four consecutive victories. He also won eight Twenty-Goal championships, and two Monty Waterbury Cups, titles. He played on the United States team in the 1969 Cup of the Americas.

He starred in the polo training film made for the United States Polo Association (USPA) called Charlie Chukker.

He was inducted into the Museum of Polo and Hall of Fame in Lake Worth, Florida on March 18, 1993.
