= Tommy Wayman =

American polo player

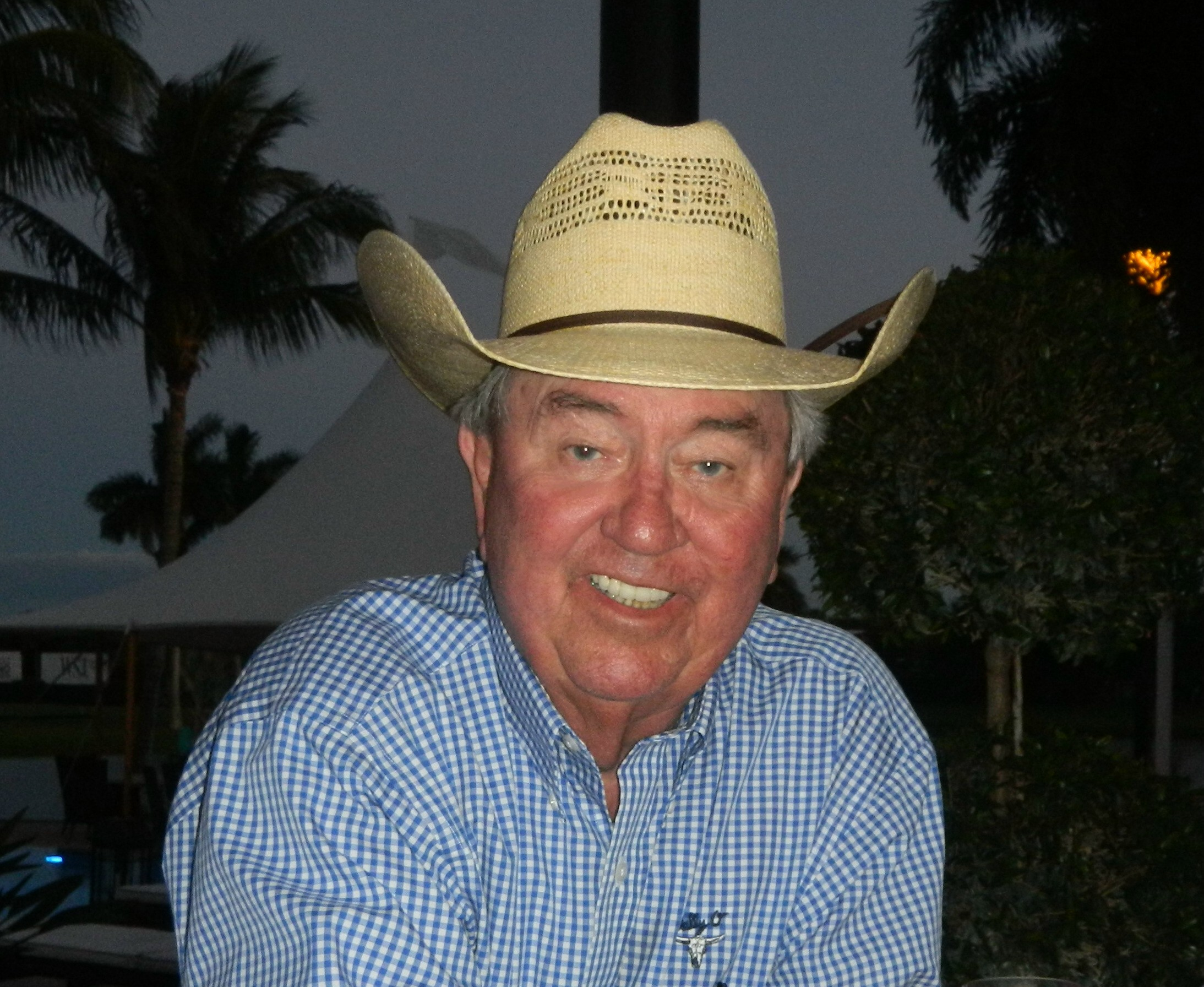
- Wayman in 2017

Personal information
- Nickname: Tommy

Sport
- Sport: Polo
- Rank: 10-goal handicap

Tommy Wayman is an American retired polo player.

Wayman was a ten-goal player. He won six U.S. Open Polo Championships, a Gold Cup, two World Cups, two Butler Handicap, and three Pacific Coast Open titles. He played on the U.S.A. team against Argentina in the Cup of the Americas and won two Coronation Cups against Great Britain. His team also played in the Camacho Cup against Mexico twice, winning once.

He owned a ranch near Big Horn, Wyoming.

He was inducted into the Museum of Polo and Hall of Fame in Lake Worth, Florida on March 6, 1998.
