= Eric Leader Pedley =

American polo player

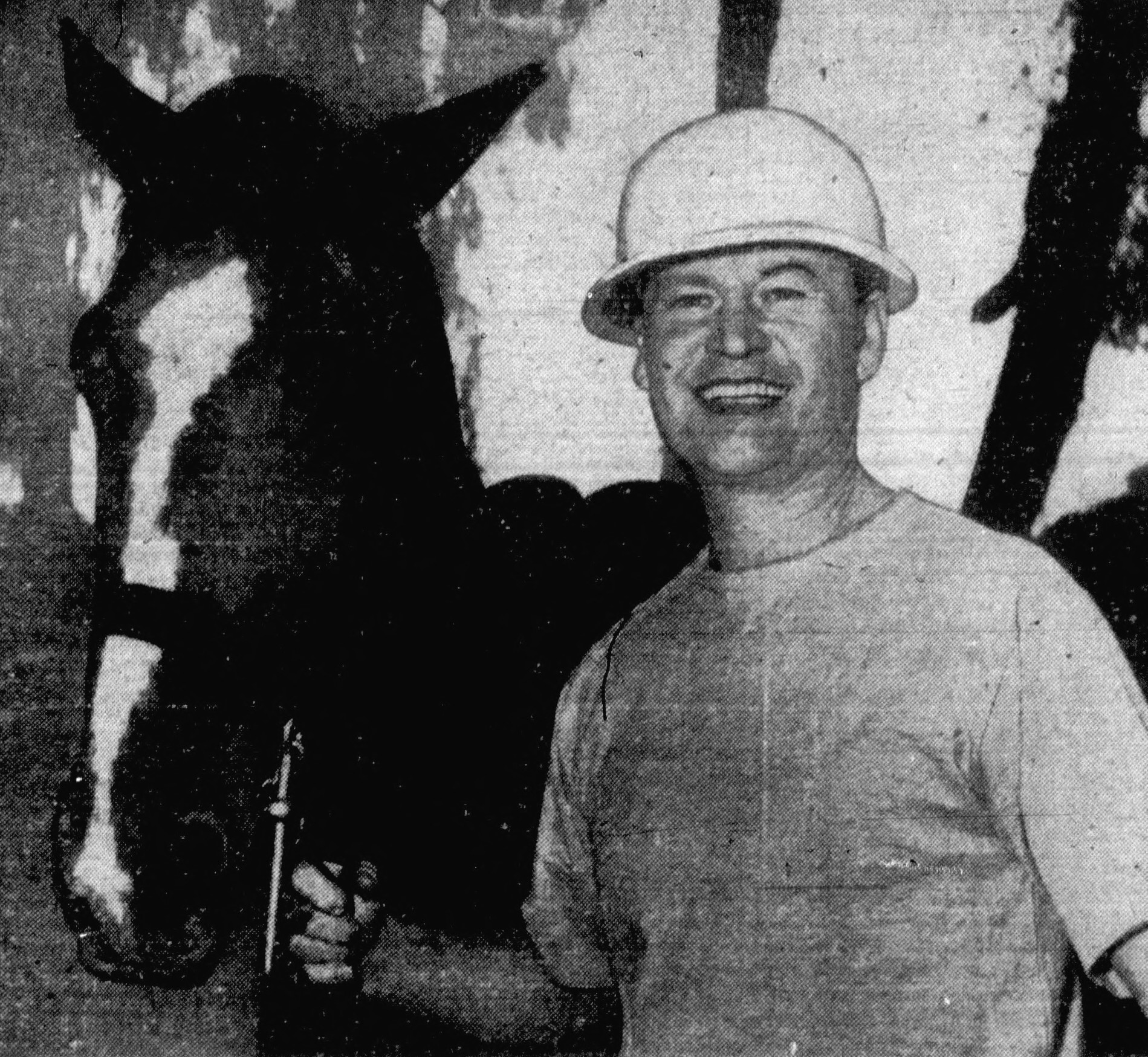
Pedley, circa 1949

Eric Leader Pedley (January 2, 1896 - May 9, 1986) was a champion polo player and mayor of Belvedere, California.

== Biography ==
He was born on January 2, 1896, in Riverside, California to William Pedley and Elizabeth Barlow Massicks. Around 1923 he married Alejandra Elena Macondray. He died on May 9, 1986, in Belvedere, California.

He earned a 9-goal handicap rating in 1930.
