= Alan Lyle Corey Jr. =

American polo player

Alan Lyle Corey Jr. (February 6, 1917 - August 24, 1998) was an American polo player.

== Biography ==
He was born on February 6, 1917, in Manhattan, New York City.

Alan Corey Jr. attended the Aiken School in Aiken, South Carolina, in the 1930s, where he started playing polo. He graduated from Yale University, where he won the Polo Intercollegiate Championship in 1938.

As a professional player, he was distinguished as a nine goal handicap in 1953 and maintained a rating of seven goals or more for the next thirty years. He won the United States Open Championship in 1940, 1941, 1950, 1953 and 1954. He also won the Monty Waterbury Cup five times, and the National Twenty Goal four times. He also won National Twelve Goal Tournament in 1963 with his son Alan, and reached the finals of the National Sixteen Goal with his younger son, Russell, in 1969.

He was an active member of the United States Polo Association (USPA), the Meadowbrook Polo Club, the Aiken Polo Club, the Piping Rock Club and the Racquet and Tennis Club. He was inducted into the Museum of Polo and Hall of Fame on March 20, 1992.

He was married to Patricia Grace, and they had one daughter, Patricia Corey Montgomerie, and two sons, Alan L. Corey III and Russell G. Corey.

He died on August 24, 1998. His wife died on January 13, 2007.
