= National Polo Center =

Sports club

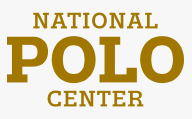

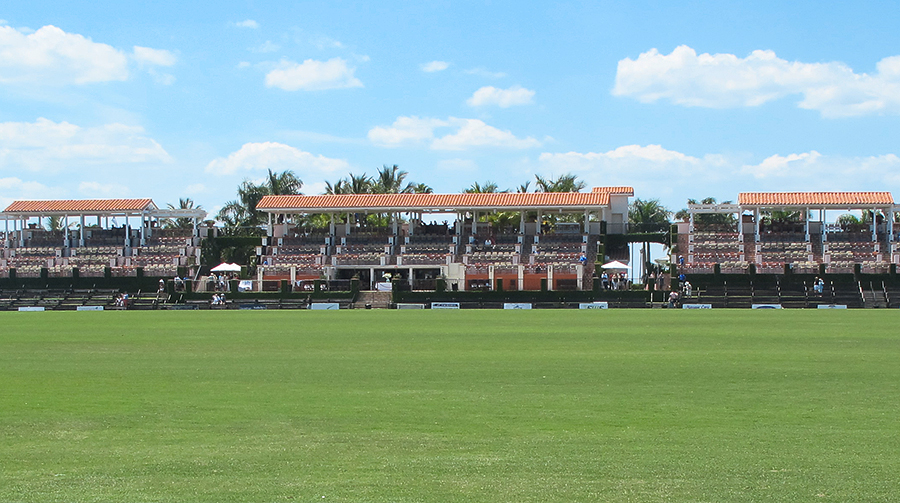
- Main stadium

- Location within Florida
- Full name: USPA National Polo Center – Wellington
- Former names: International Polo Club Palm Beach
- Location: 3667 120th Avenue South; Wellington, Florida; United States
- Coordinates: 26°37′41″N 80°14′23″W
- Owner: United States Polo Association
- Capacity: Main stadium: 1,640; The Pavilion: 500; Tailgating: 40 spots (480 people)
- Surface: Natural grass
- Field size: 300 yards long by 160 yards wide
- Acreage: 300

Construction
- Opened: 2002

Website
- www.nationalpolocenter.com

The National Polo Center (NPC), formerly the International Polo Club Palm Beach (IPC), located in Wellington, Florida, is one of the largest polo clubs in the world. The club includes several natural grass polo fields, two of which are part of stadiums. Since 2022, the facility has been owned by the United States Polo Association (USPA).

== History ==
Once home to humble agricultural lands, Wellington, Florida, has been developed into a world-famous equestrian community. The sport of polo has been a major contributor to the city's development. In 1978, William T. Ylvisaker created polo fields and introduced the mallet and ball game to the city. In the late 1990s, private polo fields owned by Summerfield Johnston Jr., Mickey Tarnapol, and John B. Goodman were combined to create a platform for high-goal competition.

In 2002, Goodman, patron of the Isla Carroll Polo team, took stewardship of these fields and founded the International Polo Club Palm Beach (IPC). The club then gained the guardianship of the 26-goal C. V. Whitney Cup polo tournament, named after Cornelius Vanderbilt Whitney. In 2004, IPC set forth on its inaugural season while construction of the clubhouse and stadium were underway. In the following years, more polo fields were added, along with grandstands, private boxes, and other amenities. In 2013, IPC celebrated its 10th anniversary season.

From 2000 to 2008, the facility was the home venue for the Palm Beach Pumas, a soccer team within the USL Premier Development League. IPC was a major sponsor of the Pumas.

In June 2022, the facility was acquired by the United States Polo Association (USPA), and renamed as the USPA National Polo Center – Wellington, more commonly known as the National Polo Center (NPC).

== Amenities ==
The main stadium holds approximately 1,640 spectators, making it the largest structure for viewing polo in the United States. Championship Field is used for Sunday matches during the winter season, and also for USPA junior polo tournaments, summer sports, equestrian-themed weddings, and corporate events.

The club has nine polo fields, an Olympic-size pool, a spa and fitness center, and a tournament-approved croquet lawn and club. It also has two tennis courts and a tennis pavilion, a wine room, and the largest collection of polo books in the world.

The restaurant seats 120 and is named The Mallet Grille after its sculpture centerpiece, which contains 120 mallets representing the capacity of the restaurant. The club bar is called the 7th Chukker.

The Pavilion is located across from Championship Field and is used for special functions, including Sunday Brunch and Polo, which is a mainstay during the 16-week winter season. The Pavilion seats 500 and has a large commercial kitchen, its own culinary staff separate from the club, and a covered veranda with views of the polo field.

== Events ==
Notable polo competitions hosted at the facility include:

- International Polo Cup – 2009, 2019, 2023
- U.S. Open Polo Championship

The facility has also hosted non-polo sporting events, including the Junior District Lacrosse Championship, American Youth Soccer Organization National Games, Ultimate Frisbee tournaments, the National Field Hockey Championship, and the National Field Hockey Festival, among others.
