= George K. Oliver =

American polo player

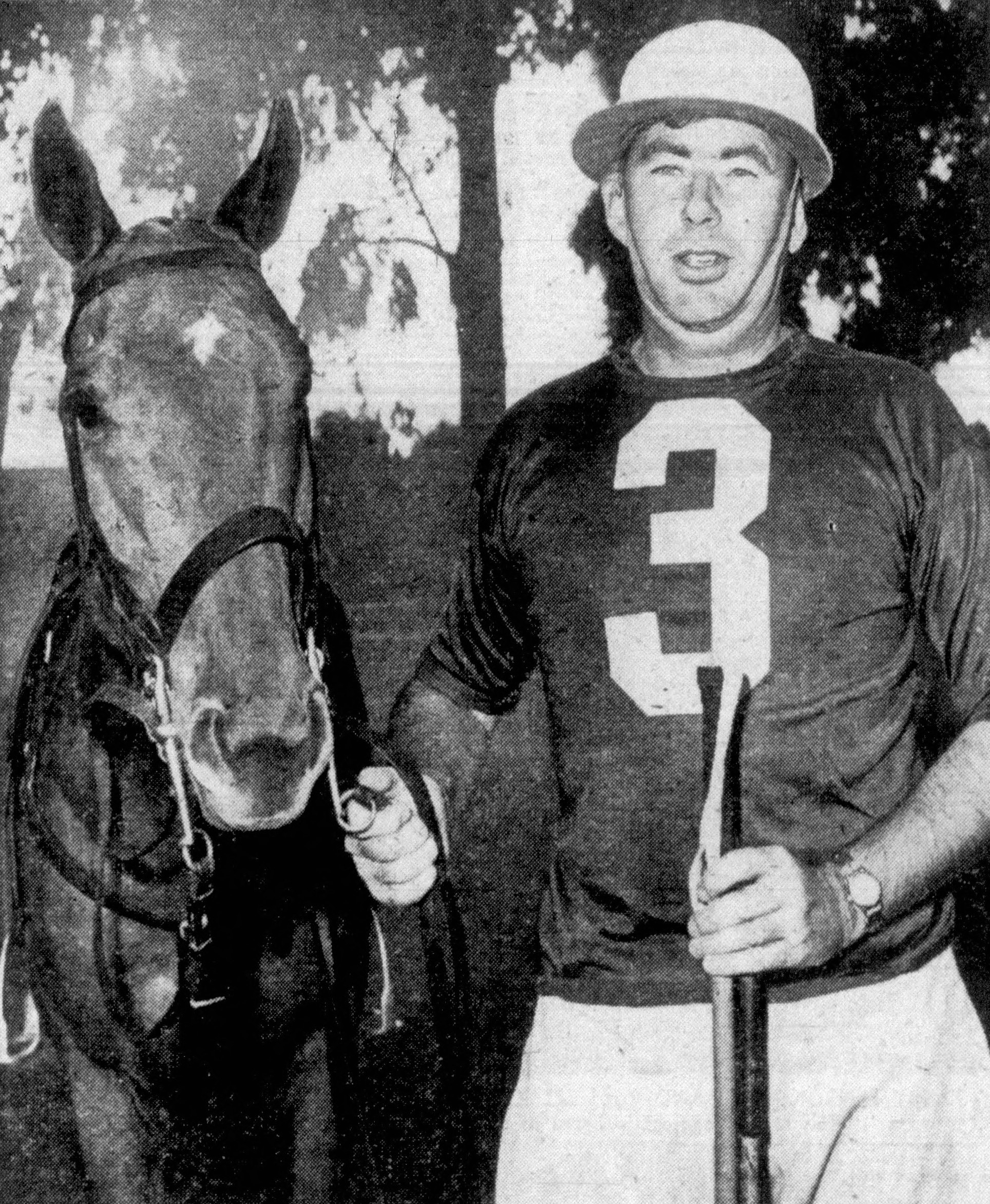
Oliver, circa 1949

George K. Oliver is an American polo player.

He won the U.S. Open Polo Championship in 1947, 1950, 1951, 1957 and 1961. He also won the National 20 goal three times, and the Deauville Gold Cup in 1952. He was a captain on the United States Team versus Argentina in 1950.

Oliver was inducted into the Museum of Polo and Hall of Fame on March 15, 1991.
