= John B. Goodman (industrialist) =

American businessman and polo player

John Bailey Goodman (born 1963) is an American businessman and polo player. He was chairman of the family-owned Goodman Manufacturing Company and founded the International Polo Club Palm Beach in Wellington, Florida. Goodman was convicted in 2014 of DUI manslaughter and vehicular homicide in connection with a 2010 automobile collision that killed 23-year-old Scott Patrick Wilson. He was sentenced to 16 years in prison.

== Early life and business career ==
Goodman grew up in Houston, Texas. His father, Harold V. Goodman, founded Goodman Manufacturing in 1975 after working in the air-conditioning industry and later became a prominent racehorse breeder. Goodman attended the Winchendon School in Massachusetts and later Wesley College in Delaware, where he studied marketing.

After college, Goodman returned to Houston and joined the family company, initially working in international sales. He later became chairman of Goodman Manufacturing. By 2004, the company was the second-largest manufacturer of heating and air-conditioning systems in the United States. That year, the Goodman family agreed to sell the company to Apollo Management in a transaction valued at approximately $1.43 billion. Goodman remained chairman following the transaction.

== Polo and publishing ==
Goodman began playing polo in Houston in 1989. In 1991, he formed the Isla Carroll polo team, named for his then-wife. The team later competed at the highest levels of American polo and won the U.S. Open in 1997.

Goodman also became involved in the administration of the sport. He served on the board of the Houston Polo Club and the United States Polo Association, and became president of the Houston Polo Club in the 1990s.

He acquired Polo magazine in the late 1990s and operated it through Westchester Media. The company subsequently became involved in trademark litigation with Polo Ralph Lauren over its use of the Polo name and the magazine's expansion into lifestyle coverage.

Goodman later founded the International Polo Club Palm Beach in Wellington, Florida.

== Personal life ==
Goodman and his former wife established an irrevocable trust in 1991 for the benefit of their two children.

In 2011, while facing a wrongful-death lawsuit arising from the 2010 automobile collision, Goodman legally adopted his adult girlfriend, Heather Hutchins. The adoption made Hutchins a beneficiary of the children's trust and attracted national attention because of its potential effect on Goodman's assets. In 2013, Florida's Third District Court of Appeal vacated the adoption after ruling that Goodman's former wife and the guardian representing his children should have been permitted to intervene in the adoption proceedings.

== Fatal collision and criminal proceedings ==
In the early morning of February 12, 2010, Goodman was driving a Bentley in Wellington, Florida, when his vehicle passed through a stop sign and collided with a car driven by 23-year-old Scott Patrick Wilson. Wilson's car was pushed into a canal, where he drowned. Authorities said Goodman left the scene and did not call emergency services for nearly an hour.

A blood test taken approximately three hours after the collision measured Goodman's blood-alcohol concentration at 0.177 percent, more than twice Florida's legal limit. Goodman maintained that his vehicle had malfunctioned and testified that he consumed alcohol after the collision rather than before it.

A jury convicted Goodman in 2012 of DUI manslaughter and vehicular homicide, and he was sentenced to 16 years in prison. The conviction was later set aside because of juror misconduct, and Goodman was granted a new trial.

At his 2014 retrial, a jury again convicted Goodman of DUI manslaughter and vehicular homicide. On November 21, 2014, he was again sentenced to 16 years in prison.

Goodman continued to challenge his conviction through post-conviction proceedings. In February 2024, a Palm Beach County judge denied his request for a new trial. At that time, Goodman was incarcerated at Everglades Correctional Institution and had a scheduled release date of January 22, 2028.

== Wrongful-death settlement ==
Wilson's parents brought a wrongful-death action following their son's death. In 2012, Goodman agreed to a settlement totaling $46 million, with $23 million allocated to each parent.
