= Santa Barbara Polo Club =

American sporting club in California

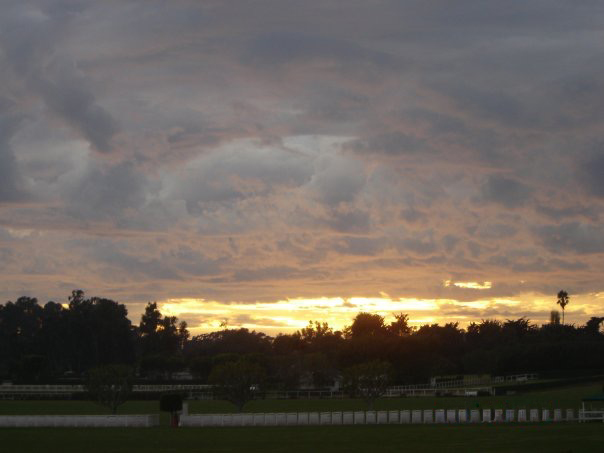
Photo of a sunset taken from the Santa Barbara Polo and Racquet Club's fields

Founded in 1911, the Santa Barbara Polo Club in Santa Barbara, California is the premiere equestrian polo club in the Western United States. The club, located between the foothills of the Santa Ynez Mountains and the Pacific Ocean, consists of three full size outdoor polo fields, one arena, extensive horse boarding and exercise facilities, as well as stabling for 350 horses. The facility is home to the Pacific Coast Open, United States Polo Association (USPA) America Cup, and the USPA Circuit Player's Cup.

The facility expanded to become the Santa Barbara Polo and Racquet Club by adding 10 tennis courts, a club house, as well as a pool and spa. There are many events hosted at the club including polo and tennis tournaments, as well as non-sporting events such as weddings.

== History ==
In 1911, the Santa Barbara Polo Club was declared an official polo club by the United States Polo Association. The club set about looking for a permanent home and found one through an $80,000 purchase of part of the property known as the Bartlett Estate on Middle Road in Montecito. The Bartlett Family took back an $80,000 loan for the property and the club raised $15,000 to build a concrete club house. They even went so far as to make the roof concrete so the members could watch the matches from on high. There were also two sets of concrete stairs to access the roof for members and waiters. The club and the fields lasted until 1928 when it was moved to its present location and the house was recently rebuilt and named Villa Polo.. During the 1920s such stars as Chaplin, Fairbanks and Will Rogers all competed here. Rogers broke his arm during a game and was quoted in the newspaper as saying,"They call this sport a gentlemans game for the same reason they call fat guys slim". The club was then erected in its present location thanks to Major Max Fleischmann. Between 1920 and 1930 the club grew in popularity and number of memberships. Horses and players arrived by train and walked to the club. World War II had adverse effects on the polo club. After a Japanese attack on Goleta, California (Attacks on North America during World War II), soldiers were stationed at the polo club to protect the members for the remaining years of the war. After a lull in polo play during the war, the Santa Barbara Club again gained momentum attracting many of the families that would eventually preserve the club. For the first time in 1963 and again in 1966, trials were held for positions on the American Polo Team for the Cup of the America's Tournament against Argentina.

During the 1970s, the club was leased by Robert Skene, a 10 Goal player who would eventually become manager and is responsible for much of the club's success. In 1974, the Santa Barbara Development Company completed construction on a new polo complex at the Santa Barbara Club in which 144 condominiums were built. Kenneth Walker, Glen Holden and Dr. Norman Ringer, Trustees of the SBPC, purchased the polo ground as well as the club house a year after the complex was completed. The club then was leased to the Santa Barbara Polo Club Management Company, Inc. During the 1990s, the club is extended to intercollegiate and interscholastic play hosting the first official interscholastic tournament in the Western United States in 1995. In 1998, the Santa Barbara Polo Club hosted the most prestigious event in polo, the Federation of International Polo (FIP) World Championship. The Olympic style event (Polo was removed from Olympic competition in 1939 and is now governed by the FIP) recorded attendance of over 20,000 people. The SBPC has to date over 500 members, more than 100 of which are full-time polo players.

The Santa Barbara Polo and Racquet Club hosts many big tournaments which bring in celebrity spectators from all around the world. In 2011 Prince William played in the Foundation Polo challenge.

== Polo Academy ==
The Santa Barbara Polo Club is home to the Santa Barbara International Polo Training Center. The SBIPTC is a polo school for beginning players, taught by Jeff Scheraga. The Polo Academy teaches interscholastic, intercollegiate, and adult players.

As of 2025, the original clubhouse (Villa Polo) has been converted into a private residence, and is now for rent.

== See also ==
- Federation of International Polo

== Sources ==
- Official Homepage of the Santa Barbara Polo Club
- Polo Club Timeline
- Polo Club History
- Photo Gallery of Polo Events
- Polo School Website
