= Roy M. Barry =

American polo player

Roy M. Barry was an American polo player.

He was on the US team against Argentina in the Americas Cup and against Mexico in the Comacho Cup. He won two Coronation Cups against Britain. He also won three U.S. Open Polo Championship (in 1962, 1968 and 1976), two Gold Cup and Butler Handicap titles, as well as Twenty-Goal and North American Cup titles.

He was inducted into the Museum of Polo and Hall of Fame on March 3, 1995.

His son Bobby Barry, also a polo player who had won the Butler Handicap, the CV Whitney, Heritage, Continental, President's, Centennial, Inter-Circuit and North American Cups., and who had competed in the U.S. Open Polo Championship, died while jogging on July 10, 2008.
