= Elmer Boeseke =

American polo player

Olympic medal record

Men's Polo
Silver medal – second place	1924 Paris	Team

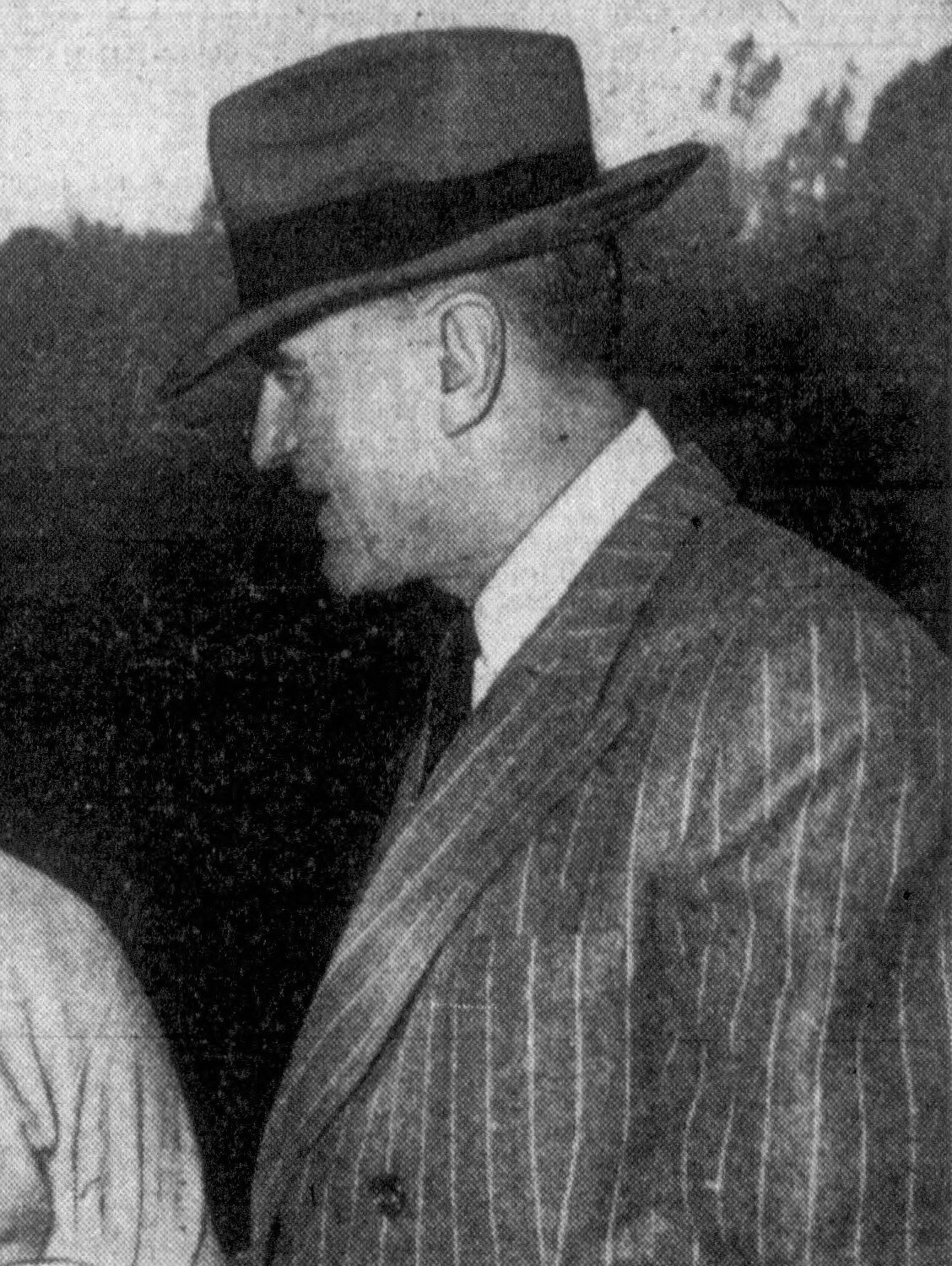
Boeseke, circa 1949

Elmer Julius Boeseke, Jr. (August 5, 1895 – October 17, 1963) was an American polo player who competed in the 1924 Summer Olympics. He was born in Santa Barbara, California. In 1924 he won the silver medal with the American team in the Olympic polo tournament.

He also won the Argentine Open Polo Championship in 1932 with Michael Phipps, Winston Guest, and William Post. It was the only time that an American team (or non-Argentina team) has ever won the Argentine Open Polo Championship.
