= Charles Thomas Irvine Roark =

English polo player

Captain Charles Thomas Irvine "Pat" Roark (1895–1939) was an English polo player. He held a ten goal handicap at the peak of his career.

== Biography ==
=== Early life ===
He was born in Ireland on 2 May 1895. His father was Thomas Irvine Roark of Wexford.

He was commissioned into the Royal Irish Rifles in October 1914, transferred to the Household Cavalry in June 1917 and served in France in 1917 with the Life Guards, after which he transferred to the Indian Army and the 34th P.A.V.O. Poona Horse (later 17th Q.V.O. Cavalry) in May 1918. He retired a captain in July 1922.

=== Career ===
He played for England in the International Polo Cup in 1927 and 1930. He won the US Open Polo Championship with his team, the Hurricanes. in 1926, 1929 and 1930. He also captained the victorious Hurricanes (polo) team in the Roehampton Cup in 1928 and 1931.

=== Personal life ===
He first married Grace Muriel Campbell (the sister of a brother officer in the Poona Horse, Captain Wentworth Edward Dallas Campbell). They were married in St Paul's Church, Umballa, Punjab, India in 1919 and they had a son (b. 1920). She divorced him in 1929 on the grounds of his adultery.

He married again in 1930.

Lastly in 1938 he married Patsy Hostetter Smith in California and they had one son. She remarried in 1942 to Walter D. K. Gibson, Jr.

He died on 18 February 1939 from injuries incurred in a fall during a practice match at Pasadena, California. He had been due to play a third International Polo Cup for England that year.
