= Adam Snow =

American record producer

- Born: Washington, D.C., U.S.
- Occupations: Musician, producer

Adam Snow is an American record producer and electronic artist from Washington, D.C. He is best known for his song "Meghan's Theme" and "Pray for Me" featuring Gucci Mane and OMB Peezy.

== Career ==
Snow worked on a remix for indie band The Lighthouse and the Whaler for their song "Venice" in 2013.

He spent the majority of 2014 playing shows as part of the Souls in Action Collective. He opened up for The Chainsmokers in May 2014.

Snow released the debut mixtape The Story So Far in 2015.

In July 2017, Snow released the single "From __ with Love" on Majestic Casual Records.

In November 2017, Snow and Gucci Mane released their collaboration track "Pray for Me" on WorldStarHipHop.

== Discography ==
=== Mixtapes ===
- The Story So Far (2015)

=== Singles ===
- "Pray for Me" feat. Gucci Mane and OMB Peezy (2017)
- "9 to 5" feat. Freddie Gibbs and Tedy Andreas (2019)
