= Stewart Iglehart =

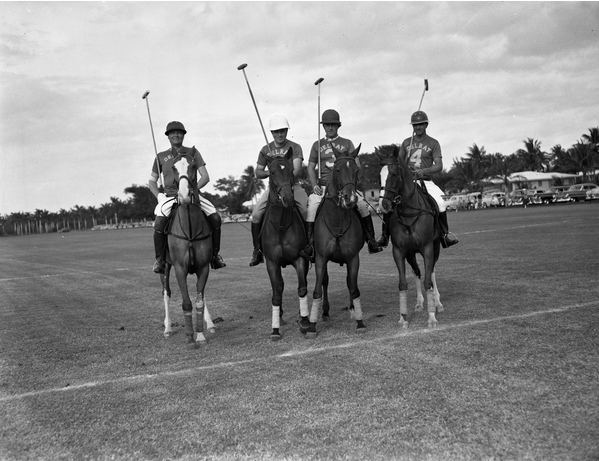
- Born: 22 February 1910 Valparaíso, Chile
- Died: 19 December 1993 (aged 83)
- Position: Defense
- Played for: Yale University; New York Athletic Club; Crescent-Hamilton A. C. New York Rovers; St. Nicholas Hockey Club
- National team: United States
- Playing career: 1969–1975
Medal record
Representing United States
Ice hockey
World Championship
Gold medal – first place	1933 Czechoslovakia

Stewart Birrell Iglehart (22 February 1910 – 19 December 1993) was a rancher, ice hockey and polo player. He was born in Valparaíso, Chile but moved to the United States at a young age. As a child he learned to play both ice hockey and polo. While in prep school he was offered a professional ice hockey contract but declined. Following prep school he attended Yale University, where he continued to play ice hockey and polo. He became one of the best defensemen in college hockey and was selected to play in two different Winter Olympics. Iglehart did not attend either. In 1933 he played for Team USA at the World Ice Hockey Championships, winning a gold medal. Following the tournament he continued to play amateur hockey, but quit to concentrate on polo.

As a polo player he won multiple championships and became a 10-goal rated player. He represented the United States internationally on several occasions. After his retirement from competitive athletics Iglehart owned a cattle ranch in Florida. He was elected to both the United States Hockey Hall of Fame and the Museum of Polo and Hall of Fame.

== Biography ==
Iglehart was born in Valparaíso, Chile, to a father who owned a steamship line, moving to the United States at the age of 6. He began playing hockey at age 10 and was taught by a former Harvard University player who emphasized lower body strength and using deceptive motions using his shoulders and eyes. At age 14 he began playing the sport of polo as well, though he considered it secondary to hockey at the time. While playing hockey at Pawling Preparatory, he was offered a professional contract from Lester Patrick, manager of the National Hockey League's (NHL) New York Rangers. He declined the offer as he had no interest in playing professional sports.

In 1928 Iglehart began playing with the varsity team at Yale University. In 1931 he helped Yale win the Intercollegiate Championship. During his time at Yale Iglehart was regarded as one of the most outstanding defensemen in the college game. In 1932 he was selected to play for Team USA at the 1932 Winter Olympics but was unable to participate. However, he was able to represent the United States the following year at the World Ice Hockey Championships. At the tournament he played right wing and center in addition to defense as Team USA won the gold medal. Following the World Championship tournament Iglehart played in the Eastern Hockey League (EHL) for the New York Rovers. He was considered one of the top amateur players during his time with the Rovers. At this time the Rovers were the farm team for the Rangers. In 1936 he was selected to represent America at the 1936 Winter Olympics, but was again unable to participate due to other responsibilities. He stopped playing hockey that same year in order to concentrate on playing polo.

Iglehart became an accomplished polo player earning a 10-goal rating, winning five Open Championships, and two Indoor Polo Open Championships. He represented The United States internationally on four occasions. In 1936 he was part of a group that attempted to purchase the NHL's New York Americans. In 1946 he was captain of the US Polo team that defeated Mexico at the United States Open Championship.

Following his playing days Iglehart and his brother Philip L. B. Iglehart owned a 24,000 acre cattle ranch in Okeechobee, Florida. He was inducted to the United States Hockey Hall of Fame in 1975, and was an inaugural member of the Polo Hall of Fame in 1990. Iglehart died in 1993.
