= William R. Linfoot =

American polo player

William R. Linfoot, also known as Billy Linfoot, was an American polo player.

== Biography ==
He was a nine-goal player. He won three U.S. Open Polo Championships, three Butler Handicap titles, five National Twenty-Goal Championships, and the North American Cup. He won three Coronation Cups, and competed twice for the Cup of the Americas.

In 1968, he was one of six polo instructors hired by the Polo Training Foundation to teach polo at Cornell University, Yale University, and the Southern Arizona School for Boys. He also taught Monty Roberts, Richard Shrake, Pat Parelli, and actor Tommy Lee Jones.

He was inducted into the Museum of Polo and Hall of Fame on March 17, 1994.
