= William T. Ylvisaker =

American businessman and polo player

William Townsend Ylvisaker (February 25, 1924 – February 6, 2010) was an American businessman and polo player.

== Biography ==
=== Early life ===
Ylvisaker was born in St. Paul, Minnesota. He went to the Lawrenceville School in New Jersey. He attended Yale University, where he served as captain of the polo team.

=== Career ===
He started his career at the General American Transportation Corporation. In 1967, he became the chairman and chief executive officer of Gould, Inc. He built a corporate campus in Rolling Meadows, Illinois, that included health clubs, swimming pools and running tracks. He retired in 1986 and founded Corporate Focus, a consulting firm on mergers and acquisitions. He owned three additional companies: Penske Tank Inc., Mercury Metal Products Inc., and Ultraflo.

In 1991, he was appointed to the executive committee of CDC Development Solutions by President George H. W. Bush and took trips to Poland, where he trained businesspeople.

=== Polo ===
A seven-goal player, he won US Open Championships, two Coronation Cups, the Gold Cup, four National twenty-goals. He also played elephant polo.

He co-founded the Polo Training Foundation alongside Northrup R. Knox and C. Heath Manning in 1967, and he served as its first vice president. He helped establish the World Polo Championship. He was the developer of the Palm Beach Polo and Country Club.

He served as chairman of the United States Polo Association from 1970 to 1975. He was inducted into the Museum of Polo and Hall of Fame on February 9, 1996.

=== Personal life ===
He lived in Wellington, Florida, from 1997 to his death in 2010. He was married and divorced three times. He had two daughters, Laurie Ylvisaker and Elizabeth Maren Keeley and two sons, the late "Billy" Ylvisaker and Jon Ylvisaker

== Bibliography ==
- Integrated technology : the story of Gould Inc. (1972)
