= Guillermo Gracida Jr. =

Mexican polo player (born 1956)

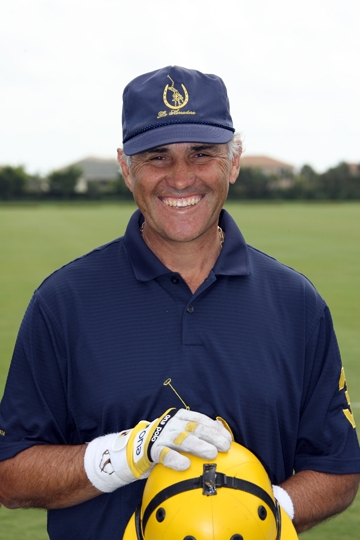
- Born: July 25, 1956 (age 69); Mexico City, Mexico
- Spouse: Mimi Oliver (m. 1978) Meghan Mccalip (m. 2014)
- Children: Michi (b. 1981); Julio (b. 1988)
- Awards: U.S. Open Won: 1977, 1979, 1982, 1984, 1985, 1987, 1988, 1989, 1990, 1992, 1993, 1994, 1995, 1996, 1997, 2004 Argentine Open Won: 1982 Australian Open Won: 1990 British Gold Cup Won: 1983 Camacho Cup Won: 1976, 1981, 1988, 2009 Coronation Cup Won: 1985, 1986 Gold Cup of the Americas Won: 1996, 1997, 1998 Pacific Coast Open Won: 1988, 1993, 1994, 1996, 2001 Monty Waterbury Won: 1978, 1998 Queen’s Cup Won: 1986, 1997 U.S. Silver Cup Won: 1980, 1981, 1984, 1995, 2003 World Cup Won: 1983, 1984, 1989, 1990, 1994, 1996, 1997 40-Goal FIP Won: 2005
- Website: MemoGracida.com

Guillermo "Memo" Gracida Jr. (born July 25, 1956) is a Mexican polo player whose international career includes several record-setting achievements, including the most U.S. Open victories (16) and the most consecutive years as an American 10-goaler (21). These feats and dozens of major tournament wins led to Gracida's selection as Player of the Centennial Era in 1990 and his induction into the National Polo Hall of Fame in 1997 while still an active player.

== Early life ==
Gracida was born in Mexico City into the first family of Mexican polo. His paternal grandfather, Gabriel Gracida Sr., was a well-known horseman, but it was father's generation that cemented the Gracidas’ reputation on the polo fields of North America. In 1946, the Gracida family represented Mexico in the most prestigious tournament in American polo, the U.S. Open Polo Championship, at New York's Meadowbrook Polo Club. Their 11–9 victory in the finals stands as the only instance in history of the United States Polo Association that the U.S. Open was won by four brothers.

The second oldest brother on that winning team was Memo's father, Guillermo Gracida Sr., who had his son riding at 2 and playing tournament polo at 10. In 1976, father and son teamed with Pablo Rincon Gallardo and Javier Rodriguez to represent Mexico in the Camacho Cup, an international competition pitting Mexico against the U.S. The tournament marked Memo's first opportunity to play international polo. Mexico won 7–4, 14–6, and 12–5.

== Career highlights ==
The 1976 Camacho Cup was not only the first time Mexico won the international competition, but it marked the debut of the up-and-coming polo star in American polo. By 1977, Gracida had relocated to San Antonio to play for Stephen M. Gose, sponsor of the powerful Retama polo team, where he would win the U.S. Open in 1977, 1979, 1982, 1984. Playing for Retama, Gracida also won the USPA Silver Cup in 1980, 1981, and 1984.

Gracida also enjoyed a long and successful career playing for Les Diables Bleus, a team sponsored by fine art dealer Guy Wildenstein. Les Diables Bleus won the U.S. Open in 1988, 1989, and 1990.

Gracida's other wins in the U.S. Open came while playing for Carter Ranch (1985), Aloha (1987), Hanaleia Bay (1992), Gehache (1993), Aspen (1994), Outback Steakhouse (1995, 1996), and Isla Carroll (1997, 2004).

Since winning the 1976 Camacho Cup, Gracida has participated in numerous international events, winning the Argentine Open (1982), the Australian Open (1990), the British Gold Cup (1983), the Coronation Cup (1985, 1986), and the Queen's Cup (1986, 1997). He captained Mexico to victory in a total of four Camacho Cups (1976, 1981, 1988, 2009).

== Awards and achievements ==
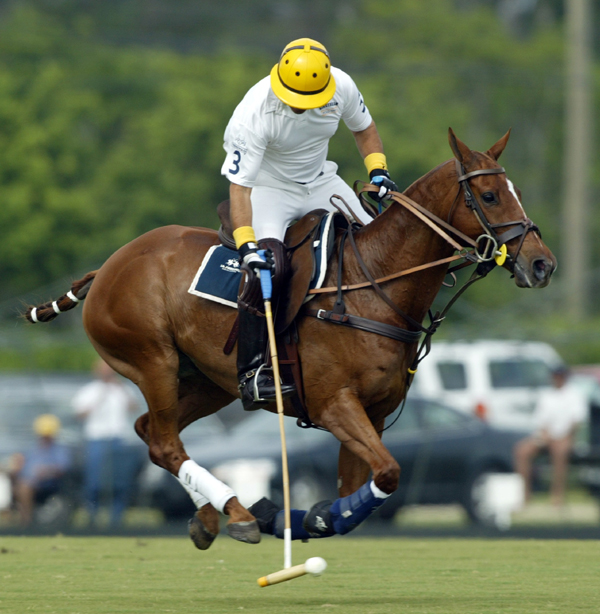
Gracida playing in Florida in 2005 Photo by David Lominska

Best results in major tournaments:

U.S. Open
Won: 1977, 1979, 1982, 1984, 1985, 1987, 1988, 1989, 1990, 1992, 1993, 1994, 1995, 1996, 1997, 2004

Argentine Open
Won: 1982

Australian Open
Won: 1990

British Gold Cup
Won: 1983

Camacho Cup
Won: 1976, 1981, 1988, 2009

Coronation Cup
Won: 1985, 1986

Gold Cup of the Americas
Won: 1996, 1997, 1998

Pacific Coast Open
Won: 1988, 1993, 1994, 1996, 2001

Monty Waterbury
Won: 1978, 1998

Queen's Cup
Won: 1986, 1997

U.S. Silver Cup
Won: 1980, 1981, 1984, 1995, 2003

World Cup
Won: 1983, 1984, 1989, 1990, 1994, 1996, 1997

40-Goal FIP
Won: 2005

Player of the Year
1990, 1991, 1996, 1997

MVP, U.S. Open
1982, 1984, 1989, 1990, 1995, 1996, 1997

Player of the Centennial Era
Selected 1990

Polo Hall of Fame
Inducted 1997

== Polo ponies ==
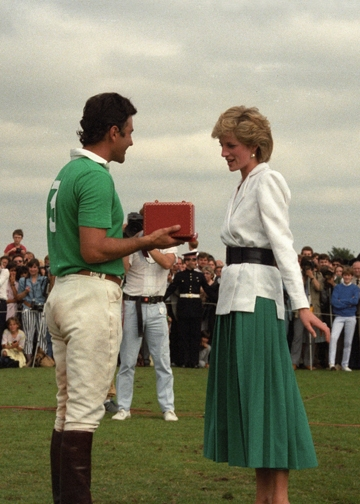
Diana, Princess of Wales presents Gracida a trophy at Guards Polo Club in 1986. Photo by David Lominska

The Gracida tradition of identifying and training outstanding horses goes back decades to Gabriel Gracida Sr., who trained Thoroughbreds for the race track as well as polo ponies for the Mexican Army. Memo Gracida continued that tradition by winning the Willis L. Hartman Trophy a record four times. The trophy is awarded annually by the United States Polo Association to the owner of the Best Playing Pony in the U.S. Open Championship. The sterling silver piece was handcrafted by Garrard and Co. Ltd., the British Crown Jewellers. Gracida's four winning polo ponies were: Kalliman (1987), Sasha (1993), Deja Vu (1995), Sasha (1997). He has also trained numerous other Hartman Trophy winners

Gracida trains and sells polo ponies of all levels: low-goal, medium-goal and high-goal horses used by 10-goal players. At his farms in Argentina and Florida, he maintains an extensive polo pony breeding program that utilizes top Thoroughbred bloodlines and embryo transfers from some of polo's best playing mares.

== Polo program ==
Since 1989, Gracida has hosted La Herradura Classic, an invitation-only weeklong event that offers amateur polo players the opportunity to sharpen their skills under the tutelage of Gracida as well as some of the world's finest polo players. Held from October through December at Gracida's Lagunas de Polo, state-of-the-art polo facility in Pilar, the capital of Argentine polo, La Herradura coincides with the Triple Crown of Argentine polo: the Hurlingham, Tortugas, and Argentine Opens.

Over the course of the last two decades, some of the world's best known team sponsors have participated in La Herradura Classic, including David Andras (Pegasus), Tom Barrack (Piocho Ranch), Ron Bonaguidi (Hanalei Bay), Anthony Embiricos (Tramontana), Tim Gannon (Outback Steakhouse), Joachim and Max Gottschalk (Les Lions), John Goodman (Isla Carroll), John Muse (Lucchese), and George Rawlings (Crab Orchard).

== Personal life ==
Gracida married Mimi Oliver in 1978. They have two children: Michi, who assists her father in his polo operations, and Julio, whose brief career as a professional polo player features victories in the country's leading high-goal tournaments, including the U.S.P.A. Silver Cup (2003), the C.V. Whitney Cup (2005), the U.S. Open (2005), and the Iglehart Cup (2009).

Memo's only brother, Carlos Gracida, who died in 2014 while playing a match in Wellington, Florida, at the International Polo Club, was a polo player of international renown as well. The two teamed together to win numerous tournaments worldwide. He is a naturalized U.S. citizen.
