= Hugo Dalmar =

American polo player

Hugo Dalmar was an American polo player.

== Biography ==
Hugo Dalmar was a four-goal player at the Oak Brook Polo Club, now known as the Chicago Polo Club. He won the U.S. Open Championship in 1971 and 1973, four USPA Twenty Goal/Silver Cup Championships (1961, '64, '65, '72), three USPA Butler Handicaps (1955, '58, '72) and the 1956, '57 USPA 12-Goal Championships.

He served as Secretaty, President, and finally Chairman of the United States Polo Association from 1975 to 1976.

He was inducted into the Museum of Polo and Hall of Fame on February 13, 2009. The USPA Hugo Dalmar Award, given annually to an individual who exemplifies good sportsmanship on and off the polo field, is named for him.
