= James F. Johnston =

James Francis Johnston (31 August 1865 – 26 February 1930) was an American businessman and the founder of the Coca-Cola Bottling Company, the first Coca-Cola franchisee. Johnston was raised in Bradley County, Tennessee. He was the son of Sarah Amelia Tucker and James Miller Johnston. By the late 1880s, Johnston was engaged in business at Pocatello, Bingham, Idaho, with his brother-in-law James H. Bible, and his future brother-in-law John Guthrie Brown. The company was Bible, Brown, and Johnston and advertised as "Indian Traders." Johnston returned to Tennessee and married Margaret Key on 9 January 1896. In 1901, Johnston, along with Benjamin Thomas, began operations of the first Coca-Cola Bottling franchise in Chattanooga, Tennessee, serving parts of Tennessee and other nearby locations. Johnston died on 26 February 1930 in Chattanooga, Tennessee.
