= Monty Waterbury Cup =

Awarded annually in polo at the Meadowbrook Polo Club in Westbury, Long Island

The Monty Waterbury Cup is awarded annually in polo at the Meadowbrook Polo Club in Westbury, Long Island. The first match was in 1922. It is named after James Montaudevert Waterbury, Jr. In 1956, Herbie Pennell was the winner.

Aknusti, winners of the 1938 Monty Waterbury Cup. Left to right: Robert L. Gerry, Jr., Elbridge T. Gerry, Sr., Mrs. Raymond Guest, Charles Thomas Irvine Roark, Raymond R. Guest
