= Gerry =

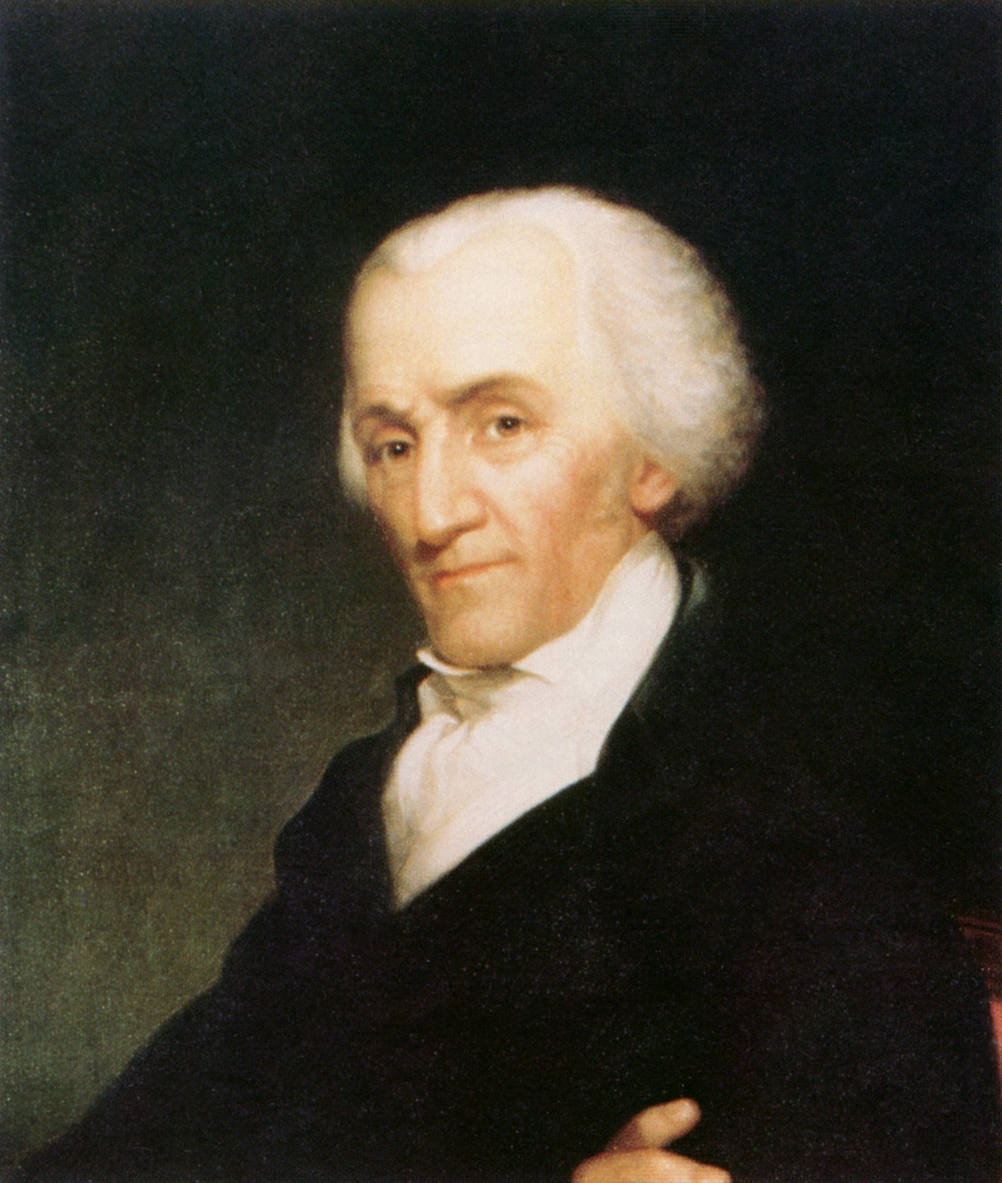
- Elbridge Gerry, after whom the term "Gerrymandering" was named
- Pronunciation: /ˈdʒɛri/ JAIR-ee /ˈɡɛri/ GEHR-ee
- Gender: Male

Other names
- Related names: Jerry, Gerald, Gerard, Geraldine

Gerry is both a surname and a masculine or feminine given name. As a given name, it is often a short form (hypocorism) of Gerard, Gerald or Geraldine. Notable people with the name include:

== Surname ==
- Elbridge Gerry (1744–1814), fifth US vice president (1813–1814) after whom the term gerrymander was named
  - Ann Gerry (1763–1849), wife of Elbridge
    - Thomas Russell Gerry (1794–1848), son of Elbridge and Ann
      - Elbridge Thomas Gerry (1837–1927), American lawyer and reformer, son of Thomas
        - Peter G. Gerry (1879–1957), U.S. Senator from Rhode Island, great-grandson of Elbridge
          - Edith Stuyvesant Gerry (1873–1958), American philanthropist and wife of Peter
          - Elbridge T. Gerry Sr. (1908–1999), American banker and polo player, great-great-grandson of the vice president
          - Robert L. Gerry Jr. (1911–1979), American polo player, brother of Elbridge Sr
            - Robert L. Gerry III (born 1937), American businessman, son of Robert L. Jr
- Alan Gerry (born 1929), American billionaire and founder of Cablevision Industries
- Elbridge Gerry (Maine politician) (1813–1886), American lawyer and politician
- Eloise Gerry (1885–1970), American forestry research scientist
- Nathan Gerry (born 1995), American football player
- Robert Gerry (politician) (1858–1931), American politician

== Given name ==
- Gerry Adams (born 1948), Irish republican politician
- Gerry Adams Sr. (1926–2003), Irish Republic Army volunteer, father of the Irish politician and alleged abuser of his family
- Gerry Adams (fencer) (born 1962), Australian fencer
- Gerry Alanguilan (1968–2019), Filipino comic book artist and writer
- Gerry Anderson, English producer and director (1929–2012)
- Gerry Armstrong (activist) (born 1946), critic and former member of the Church of Scientology
- Gerry Armstrong (footballer) (born 1954), Northern Irish footballer
- Gerry Barney (born 1939), British designer
- Gerry Bohanon (born 1999), American football player
- Gerry Boulet (1946–1990), Canadian rock singer
- Gerry Bertier (1953–1981), Virginia high school football player
- Gerry Brown (disambiguation), multiple people
- Gerry Brownlee (born 1956), New Zealand politician
- Gerry Byrne (politician) (born 1966), Canadian politician
- Gerry Byrne (footballer, born 1938) (1938–2015), English footballer
- Gerry Cheevers (born 1940), Canadian retired National Hockey League goaltender
- Gerry Cinnamon, Scottish musician born Gerald Crosbie in 1985
- Gerry Collins (disambiguation), multiple people
- Gerry Cooney (born 1956), American former boxer
- Gerry Davis (disambiguation), multiple people
- Gerry Dee, Canadian comedian born Gerard Donoghue in 1968
- Gerry De Silva (born 1940), Sri Lanka Army general
- Gerry Dick, American journalist and host of Inside Indiana Business
- Gerry Duggan (writer) (born 1973), American writer
- Gerry Francis (born 1951), English former footballer and manager
- Gerry Francis (footballer, born 1933) (1933–2025), South African-born footballer
- Gerry Geran (1896–1981), American ice hockey player
- Gerry Gibeault (born 1953), Canadian politician
- Gerry Glaude (1927–2017), Canadian ice hockey defenceman
- Gerry Goffin (1939–2014), American lyricist, husband of Carole King
- Gerry Harris (disambiguation), multiple people
- Gerry Harvey (born 1939), Australian entrepreneur
- Gerry Patrick Hemming (1937–2008), U.S. Marine mercenary and CIA agent
- Gerry Hitchens (1934–1983), English footballer
- Gerry Kearby (1947–2012), American entrepreneur
- Gerry Kelly (born 1953), Irish republican politician and former Provisional Irish Republican Army volunteer
- Gerry Kelly (broadcaster) (born 1948), Northern Irish broadcaster and journalist
- Gerry Kelly (footballer) (1908–1983), English footballer
- Gerry Leonard (born 1961/1962), Irish musician
- Gerry Lindgren (born 1946), American track and field runner
- Gerry McMonagle, political figure in Ireland
- Gerry McCoy (born 1960), Scottish footballer
- Gerry Marsden (1942–2021), English musician, frontman of Gerry and the Pacemakers
- Gerry Morrow (born 1949), Martinique-born Canadian professional wrestler
- Gerry Mulligan (1927–1996), American jazz saxophonist, clarinetist, arranger and composer
- Gerry Murphy (disambiguation), multiple people
- Gerry O'Connor (disambiguation), multiple people
- Gerry Peñalosa (born 1972), Filipino former boxer and WBC and WBO world champion
- Gerry Peyton (born 1956), Irish former football goalkeeper and coach
- Gerry Philipsen (born 1944), American academic and ethnographer
- Gerry Phillips (born 1940), Canadian politician
- Gerry Rafferty (1947–2011), Scottish singer and songwriter
- Gerry Reynolds (Irish politician) (born 1961), Irish politician
- Gerry Reynolds (British politician) (1927–1969), British politician
- Gerry Roxas (1924–1982), Filipino politician
- Gerry Ryan (disambiguation), multiple people
- Gerry Sayer (1905–1942), chief test pilot for Gloster Aircraft
- Gerry Scott (1944–2007), English television production designer
- Gerry Scotti (born 1956), Italian television presenter
- Gerry Sharpe (disambiguation)
- Gerry Sherry, American football player
- Gerry Spence (born 1929), American semi-retired trial lawyer
- Gerry Steinberg (1945–2015), British politician
- Gerry Sutcliffe (born 1953), British politician
- Gerry Tuttle (1926–2006), American football player
- Gerry Ward (basketball) (born 1941), American retired National Basketball Association player
- Gerry Ward (footballer) (1936–1994), English footballer
- Gerry Watson, better known as Bubba Watson (born 1978), American golfer
- Gerry Williams (footballer) (1877–1901), Australian rules footballer

== Fictional characters ==
- Gerry Torciano, a character from The Sopranos

== See also ==
- Gary (disambiguation)
- Gehry (surname)
- Geri (disambiguation)
- Gery (disambiguation)
- Jerry (given name)
