= Robert Gerry =

Robert Gerry may refer to:

- Robert Gerry (politician) (1858–1931), American politician
- Robert Livingston Gerry Sr. (1877–1957), American thoroughbred horse owner and breeder
- Robert L. Gerry Jr. (1911–1979), American polo player
- Robert L. Gerry III (born 1937), American businessman and petroleum industry executive
