= Robert Livingston Gerry =

Robert Livingston Gerry may refer to:

- Robert Livingston Gerry Sr. (1877–1957), American businessman and owner of thoroughbred racehorses
- Robert L. Gerry Jr. (1911–1979), American polo player
- Robert L. Gerry III (born 1937), American businessman and petroleum industry executive

== See also ==
- Robert Livingston (disambiguation)
