= SPCC =

SPCC might refer to:

== Educational institutions ==
- St. Paul's Co-educational College in Hong Kong
- St. Philip's Christian College in Waratah, Australia
- St Peter Claver College in Riverview, Australia
- South Piedmont Community College in the US state of North Carolina

== Societies for the Prevention of Cruelty to Children ==
- National Society for the Prevention of Cruelty to Children
- Irish Society for the Prevention of Cruelty to Children
- Massachusetts Society for the Prevention of Cruelty to Children
- New York Society for the Prevention of Cruelty to Children
- Children 1st, previously known as the Royal Scottish Society for Prevention of Cruelty to Children

== Other ==
- St Pancras Cruising Club, a members' group of canal boat owners in London
- St. Paul Curling Club in St. Paul, Minnesota
- Sex Positive Community Center in Seattle, Washington
- Shelly Park Cruising Club
- Sikkim Pradesh Congress Committee, branch of the Indian National Congress in Sikkim
- Spill Prevention, Control and Countermeasure, a program of the United States Environmental Protection Agency
- Southern Pacific Communications Company, a component part of the U.S. telecom company CenturyLink
- Cold Rolled Carbon Steel Sheets and Strip, a Japanese industrial standard
