= George Haas Jr. =

American businessman and polo player

- Born: September 10, 1920; New York City
- Died: June 12, 2006 (aged 85)
- Occupations: Businessman, polo player

George Haas Jr. (September 10, 1920 – June 12, 2006) was an American businessman and polo player. He founded the Haas Financial Corporation.

== Biography ==
=== Early life ===
George Haas Jr. was born on September 10, 1920, in New York City, the son of Clara (née Simon) and George Charles Haas. His grandfather was Abraham Haas. He attended Brooks School, a private school in North Andover, Massachusetts. He graduated from Yale University, where he won his first polo trophy in 1938.

=== Second World War ===
He joined the United States Army in the Second World War and served as a 2nd Lieutenant in the 6th Armored Division. He was captured by German soldiers and managed to escape six months later. He later received the Silver Star, the Purple Heart and the Air Medal.

=== Business ===
In the 1950s, he worked in industrial sales for The Coca-Cola Company, followed by PepsiCo. In 1960, he founded the Haas Financial Corporation headquartered in New York City. It specialized in beverage industry mergers and acquisitions as well as commercial aviation leases.

=== Polo ===
As a professional polo player, he won the East Coast Open three times, the Monty Waterbury Cup three times and the Arena Sherman Memorial.

He served as President of the Gulfstream Polo Club in Lake Worth, Florida. In 2003, he sold his property near the grounds of the Gulfstream Polo Club, in the midst of controversy about the possible relocation of the club.

As chairman of the United States Polo Association's Safety and International Committees, he improved the safety of polo helmets. He also served on the executive committee of the Federation of International Polo. He served as chairman of the Polo Training Foundation. He served on the board of the Museum of Polo and Hall of Fame and was inducted on February 16, 2002.

=== Personal life ===
He died on June 12, 2006.

== Bibliography ==
- Against All Odds (1998)
