= Elbridge T. Gerry Sr. =

American banker and polo player (1908–1999)

Elbridge T. Gerry
- Born: Elbridge Thomas Gerry; November 22, 1908; New York City, New York
- Died: February 26, 1999 (aged 90); Delhi, New York
- Education: St. Bernard's School; St. Paul's School; Harvard College
- Spouse: Marjorie Kane (m. 1932)
- Children: 3
- Parent(s): Robert Livingston Gerry Sr. Cornelia Averell Harriman
- Relatives: Robert Livingston Gerry Jr. (brother); W. Averell Harriman (uncle); E. Roland Harriman (uncle); Peter Goelet Gerry (uncle)

Elbridge Thomas Gerry (November 22, 1908 – February 26, 1999), known as Ebby Gerry, was an American banker and polo player as well as an heir to both the wealthy Gerry and Harriman families.

== Early life ==
Gerry was born in New York City on November 22, 1908. His parents were Robert Livingston Gerry Sr. (1877–1957) and Cornelia Averell Harriman (1884-1966). His brothers were Robert Livingston Gerry Jr., Henry Averell Gerry, and Edward Harriman Gerry. His uncles included New York Governor W. Averell Harriman and E. Roland Harriman. His great-great-grandfather was Elbridge Gerry, a signer of the Declaration of Independence and the Articles of Confederation.

Gerry was named after his paternal grandfather, Elbridge Thomas Gerry (1837–1927), who was usually called "Commodore" due to the office he held with the New York Yacht Club, who co-founded the New York Society for the Prevention of Cruelty to Children, sometimes called the Gerry Society.

He attended St. Bernard's School, the Aiken Preparatory School in Aiken, South Carolina, St. Paul's School in Concord, New Hampshire, and Harvard College, where he graduated in 1931. At Harvard, he was the Captain of the polo team.

== Career ==
He started his career in banking at the Hanover Bank in New York. In 1936, he joined Brown Brothers Harriman & Co. During the Second World War, he served as an intelligence officer for Gen. Dwight D. Eisenhower and rose to the rank of Major. In 1956, he became a general partner of Brown Brothers Harriman & Co., and by 1968, he was on the Steering Committee. From 1957 to 1986, he was a director of the Union Pacific Railroad and head of its board's Executive Committee from 1969 to 1986.

== Horseracing and polo ==
He was a founding member and President of the Harness Racing Museum & Hall of Fame in Goshen, New York, where he was inducted in 1975. He was a partner in the Arden Homestead Stable with his uncle E. Roland Harriman. The stable produced two winners of the Hambletonian Stakes: Titan Hanover in 1945 and Flirth in 1973.

He won the U.S. Open Polo Championship and the Monty Waterbury Cup, three times each. He played with Thomas Hitchcock Sr. and Stewart Iglehart. He served as Chairman of the United States Polo Association (USPA) from 1940 to 1946. He was inducted into the Museum of Polo and Hall of Fame on March 15, 1991.

== Philanthropy ==
He served as a vice president and Trustee at The Boys' Club of New York. He also served as Trustee and President of the New York Society for the Prevention of Cruelty to Children, founded by his grandfather, Elbridge Thomas Gerry, in 1875.

== Personal life, death and legacy ==
In 1932, Gerry was married to Marjorie Y. Kane (1909–1999), the daughter of John P. Kane (d. 1949). She attended Miss Chapin's School and graduated from the Ethel Walker School in Simsbury, Connecticut, in 1927. The wedding took place at the Episcopal Church of St. John of Lattingtown. After the ceremony, the reception took place at High Lindens, the bride's parents house. He had two sons and a daughter. His son Peter Goelet Gerry, Jr. was the co-founder and managing partner of Sycamore Ventures, a private equity and venture capital investment firm.

Gerry died at his home in Delhi, New York on February 26, 1999. His wife died shortly after he did.
