= Robert Walton =

Robert Walton may refer to:

- Robert E. Walton, American polo player and coach
- Robert Walton (restaurateur), British restaurateur
- Bob Walton (ice hockey) (1912–1992), Canadian professional ice hockey forward for the Montreal Canadiens and Pittsburgh Hornets.
- Rob Walton (born 1944), American billionaire and former chairman of Walmart
- Rob Walton (ice hockey) (1949–2018), Canadian professional ice hockey player
- Bob Walton (police commissioner) (1921–2008), New Zealand police officer
- Robert Walton, character in the 1818 novel Frankenstein
- Robert Walton Goelet (1880–1941), American businessman
- Robert Walton Moore (1859–1941), American lawyer and politician
