= Down East Polo Club =

The Down East Polo Club is the only polo club in Maine, U.S. It is located in South Harpswell, It was established in 1978, and affiliated with the United States Polo Association in 1984.
