= Fred W. Dailey =

- Occupations: Hotelier and polo enthusiast

Fred W. Dailey was an American hotelier and polo enthusiast.

== Biography ==
In the 1950s, he opened the Waikikian Hotel and the Tahitian Lanai restaurant. They also owned a family farm in Virginia. Meanwhile, he revived the sport of polo in Hawaii, first in Kapiolani Park and then in Mokuleia. It is now known as the Hawaii Polo Club. He also worked for the United States Polo Association. He was inducted into the Museum of Polo and Hall of Fame on February 7, 1997.

He was married to Elizabeth "Murph" Dailey. His son, Michael Dailey, is a polo player and hotelier. He serves as President of the Hawaii Polo Inn and its management company, Honolulu Hotel Operating Corporation. His grandson, Devon Dailey, attended the University of Virginia on a polo scholarship. He now serves as the manager of the Hawaii Polo Club.

== Bibliography ==
- Polo Is a Four Letter Word: An Equine History of Polo in Hawaii (1986)
