= Gulfstream Polo Club =

Former polo club in Lake Worth, Florida

Coordinates: 26.613°N 80.180°W

The Gulfstream Polo Club was a polo club in Lake Worth, Florida. Since 1923, Gulfstream Polo Club was one of the most prominent polo clubs in North America, particularly during the Florida season (December–April). Gulfstream was managed by Marla Connor for 18 years until it closed in May 2016 at the end of the polo season. Throughout its long history it offered a wide array of tournaments, with 4, 6, and 10 Goal Leagues as well as Ladies Tournaments.

== Location ==
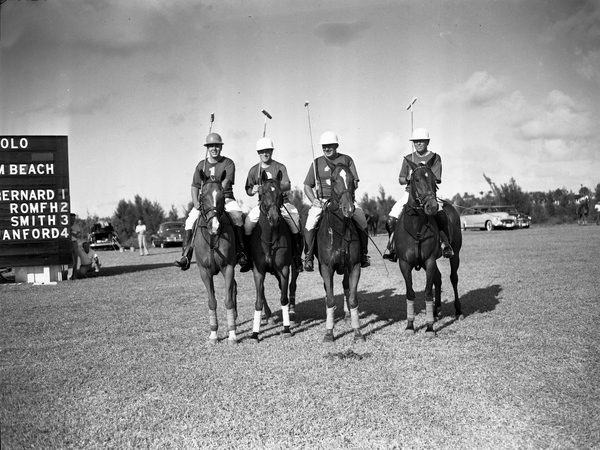
Gulfstream Polo Club team at the Gulfstream Club, 1949

It was located at 4550 Polo Road, Lake Worth, Florida, 33467, not far from the Museum of Polo and Hall of Fame.

== History ==
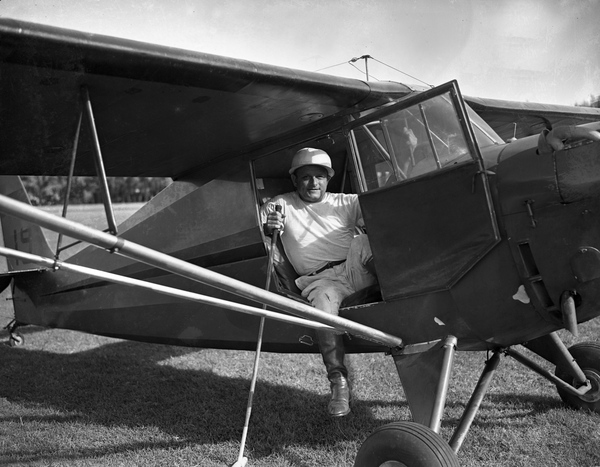
American Bantam Car Company president Roy S. Evans in a plane at the Gulfstream Polo Club, circa 1945

It was started by the Phipps family North of Delray Beach, Florida in 1923, making it the oldest polo club in Florida. It became affiliated with the United States Polo Association in 1935.

In 1941, John H. H. Phipps, Michael Grace Phipps (1910–1973), Charles Skiddy von Stade and Alan L. Corey, Jr., all players in residence at the Gulfstream Polo Club, won the U.S. Open Polo Championship at the Meadow Brook Polo Club. However, during the Second World War, the club was closed and the stables were used by US troops in case of an invasion.

In the 1960s, the Phipps family sold the land in Delray Beach. Philip L. B. Iglehart (1913-1993) together with Jim Kraml, Sr., Norberto Azqueta Sr., Robert Uihlein, Jr. (1916-1976), William Taylor, William Stamps Farish III (born 1939), James H. Binger (1916-2004), George C. Sherman, Jr. and Paul Butler (1892-1981) purchased land in Lake Worth and re-established the polo club there. There were five fields, including the Bostwick Field, named after Pete Bostwick (1909-1982), who was a club member. Summerfield Johnston, Jr. served as a long-time club president.

It has been home to the USPA Delegate's Cup (8-Goal) since the mid-1970s, the USPA Bronze Cup (12-Goal) since the early 1980s, and the Heritage Cup (16-Goal) since 1987.

The club closed permanently on May 20, 2016, following acquisition by Pulte Homes, a real estate development firm.
