= Carlton Beal =

American businessman and polo player

Carlton Beal (1914–1994) was an American businessman, college professor and polo player.

== Biography ==
=== Early life ===
Carlton Evans Beal was born on September 3, 1914, in Los Angeles, California. His father, Carl H. Beal, Vice-President of Marland Oil Company, is credited with discovering some of California's greatest oil fields. He attended the Menlo School. He received a Bachelor of Science in Civil Engineering from Stanford University in 1936 and a master's degree in Petroleum Engineering from the Massachusetts Institute of Technology in 1938.

=== Career ===
During the Second World War, he worked for the Petroleum Administration for War. After World War II, he became assistant professor at the University of Southern California in Los Angeles. In 1954, he moved to Midland, Texas, with his family and hired Allen "Moose" Trobaugh. Together, they created Beal, Trobaugh and Associates (BTA). BTA drilled 1,500 wells.

He was a member of the American Institute of Mining Engineers, the American Petroleum Institute, the American Association of Petroleum Geologists, the Independent Petroleum Association of America, Western Geophysical Association and the Permian Basin Petroleum Association.

=== Polo ===
He learned how to play polo from Hugh Drury and Snowy Baker. As a professional player, he won the Monty Waterbury Cup in 1950 at the Meadow Brook Polo Club, the U.S. Open Championship in 1952 at the Beverly Hills Polo Club. In 1956, rated at six goals, he won the Intercircuit Cup with two of his sons at the Oak Brook Polo Club, now known as the Chicago Polo Club.

He was a governor of the United States Polo Association (USPA) and the Polo Training Foundation. He was also a Governor of the Museum of Polo and Hall of Fame, where he was inducted on March 20, 1992. He donated the Philip L.B. Iglehart Library Room to the Museum of Polo.

=== Personal life ===
He married Keleen Haubner in 1938. His son, Carlton Beal, Jr., has been a partner of BTA Oil Producers since 1967. The business continues to be owned by Carlton Beal's sons and grandsons.

=== Legacy ===
The Keleen & Carlton Beal Professorship at Stanford University is currently held by Professor Anthony R. Kovscek.
