= Gonzalo Tanoira =

Polo player

Gonzalo Tanoira (24 June 1944 – 17 December 2004) was an Argentine polo player.

== Biography ==
He attained 10 goals in Argentina in 1970 and he was rated at 10 goals in U.S. in 1976. He won the USPA Gold Cup in 1982. He has won several thirty-goal World Cups played in Palm Beach, Florida. He was named World Cup MVP four times, in 1977, 1980, 1981 and 1982.

He has served as president of the Argentine Polo Association. He was inducted into the Museum of Polo and Hall of Fame in Lake Worth, Florida on February 13, 2009.

He died in 2004. His wife, Luisa Miguens, published Passion & Glory: A Century of Argentine Polo. His son, Javier Tanoira, published Reflections on Argentine Polo.
