= George C. Sherman Jr. =

American polo player

George Carter Sherman Jr. (July 12, 1911 – February 3, 1986) was an American polo player.

== Early life and career ==
George Sherman began playing polo at age 15. His father, George Carter Sherman Sr., was a well-known polo player and founder of the National Indoor Polo Association. He graduated from Yale University in 1934. He was captain of the polo team in his freshman year, and he promoted college polo alongside Robert A. Graviss.

Sherman served as senior vice president of Rollins Burdick Hunter, the insurance broker, and chairman of its office in Fort Lauderdale, Florida.

== Polo ==
Sherman served as chairman of the Indoor Polo Association, and the United States Polo Association in Lexington, Kentucky from 1960 to 1966. He was also involved with the Gulfstream Polo Club in Lake Worth, Florida.

Sherman is credited as a co-founder — alongside H. Jeremy Chisholm, Leverett S. Miller, and Philip L. B. Iglehart — of the Museum of Polo and Hall of Fame, which opened in 1988. He was inducted into its Hall of Fame in 1998.

Sherman donated a painting by Chester Harding, Portrait of a Lady, to the Yale University Art Gallery.

== Death ==
Sherman died of leukemia in New York on February 3, 1986, at the age of 74.
