= Statue of Henry Bergh =

Statue in Milwaukee, Wisconsin

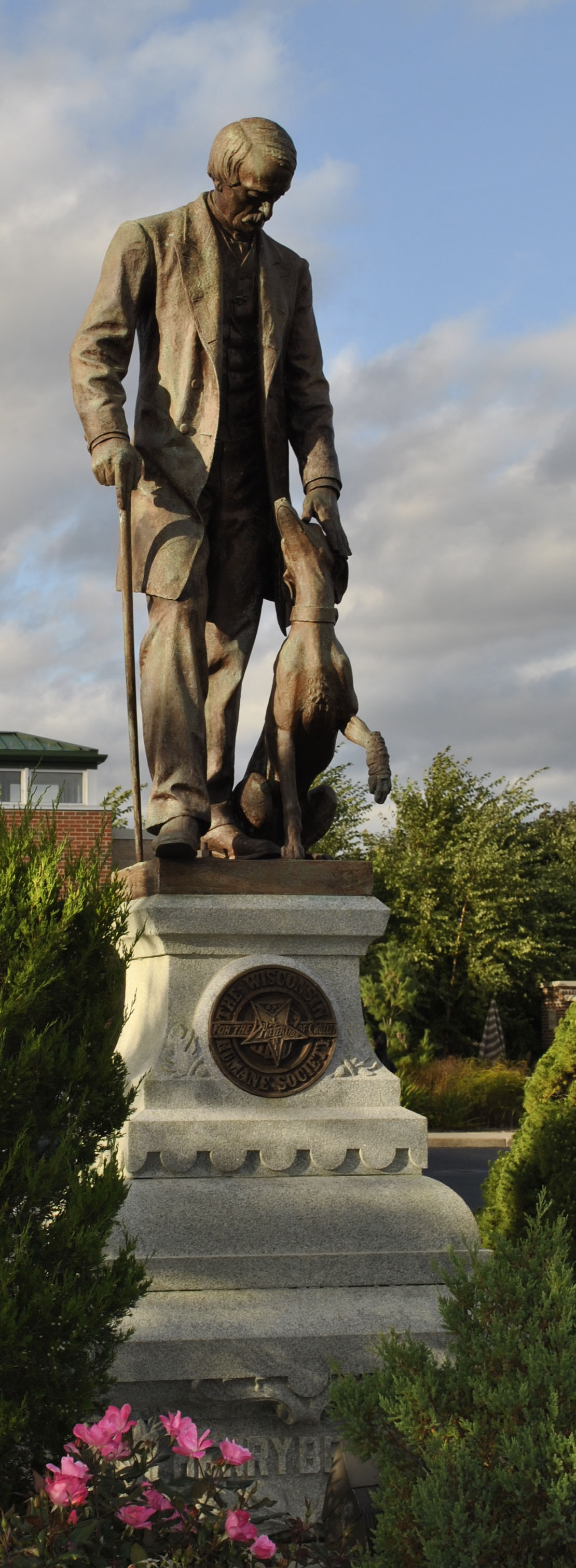
- Artist: James H. Mahoney
- Year: 1891
- Dimensions: 270 cm (108 in)
- Location: 4500 W. Wisconsin Ave., Milwaukee; 43°02′20.38″N 87°58′10.11″W\

Henry Bergh is a statue by American artist James H. Mahoney located at the Wisconsin Humane Society in Milwaukee, Wisconsin, United States. The bronze statue portrays Henry Bergh, the father of the humane movement in the United States, holding a cane in his proper right hand and petting a dog with a bandaged paw with his proper left hand. It was created in 1891 and stands 9 feet high.

== Description of the sculpture ==
Mahoney's statue is a full-length bronze of Henry Bergh. He wears a frock coat, vest, pants and boots, while holding a cane and petting a wounded dog. The statue's granite base has the raised inscription HENRY BERGH. The right front of the base reads American Bronze Co. Chicago Illinois. There is also a circular plaque on the base that reads The Wisconsin Humane Society, as well as a United States seal with a ribbon and star that included a founder's mark. The circular plaque was added to the base in 1941 in honor of its 50th dedication anniversary.

Henry Bergh grew up an aristocrat and graduated from Columbia College in the 1830s. Following college he became a diplomat at the American Delegation in Saint Petersburg, Russia. It was during this time that he noticed the drivers' cruel treatment of horses. Once back in America he realized that Americans also mistreated their horses by requiring them to pull very heavy loads. Bergh traveled to England to learn about their humane society and, upon his return to America in 1866, founded the Society for the Prevention of Cruelty to Animals. This was subsequently expanded in 1877 into the American Humane Association, which included both the Society for the Prevention of Cruelty to Animals and the Society for the Prevention of Cruelty to Children. The Wisconsin Humane Society was founded in 1879 with Richard D. Whitehead serving as its superintendent. Whitehead commissioned the sculpture, raising the $14,000 needed to create it. The statue was placed in the heavily trafficked Market Square on April 29, 1891 and dedicated with an elaborate ceremony that included releasing white pigeons to fly over the statue, and having a pony be the first to drink from the trough.

The statue was unveiled on April 29, 1891 by Sherburn Merrill-Smith in memory of Bergh. It was originally placed atop an animal watering trough in downtown Milwaukee's Market Square, near the present City Hall.

Short video of sculpture.

=== Location history ===
"The Milwaukee City Hall was built on Market Square in 1895, increasing the traffic around the Bergh monument. By 1941 few horses were seen on the streets of Milwaukee and it was decided to convert the watering trough to a flower bed." Since then it has been moved several times. It was first moved to the Wisconsin Humane Society in 1966 when the Marshall and Ilsley Bank planned to build a new structure on its site. Because the statue was too heavy to transport over Milwaukee's bridges, it was taken without the watering trough. The statue has moved with the Wisconsin Humane Society as it has changed locations over the years. It currently stands in front of the Humane Society's building on West Wisconsin Avenue. According to the Wisconsin Humane Society's website, this is the only known statue of Henry Bergh in the United States.

=== Condition of the statue ===
"Treatment completed to restore statue in June 2013."

== The sculptor ==
James H. Mahoney was the sculptor who produced this bronze statue in 1891. Mahoney is also credited as one of the artists who produced the National Monument to the Forefathers in Plymouth, Massachusetts.

== See also ==
- Animalier
- R.D. Whitehead Monument
