= William Sinclaire =

American polo player

William Sinclaire is an American polo player.

== Biography ==
As a player, he was on the winning USA team in the Camacho Cup series with Mexico in 1975, and he won the Butler Handicap in 1976.

Shortly after the Second World War, he helped develop polo in the Rocky Mountain area, especially around Denver, Colorado. He served as Governor of the United States Polo Association (USPA) from 1969 to 1971, Treasurer from 1971 to 1973, Vice President from 1973 to 1976, President from 1976 to 1980, and Chairman from 1980 to 1984. He now serves as Honorary Governor. In 1989, he was awarded the Hugo Dalmar Award from the USPA.

He was inducted into the Museum of Polo and Hall of Fame on February 16, 2007.
