= Robert Livingston Gerry Sr. =

American businessman and racehorse owner

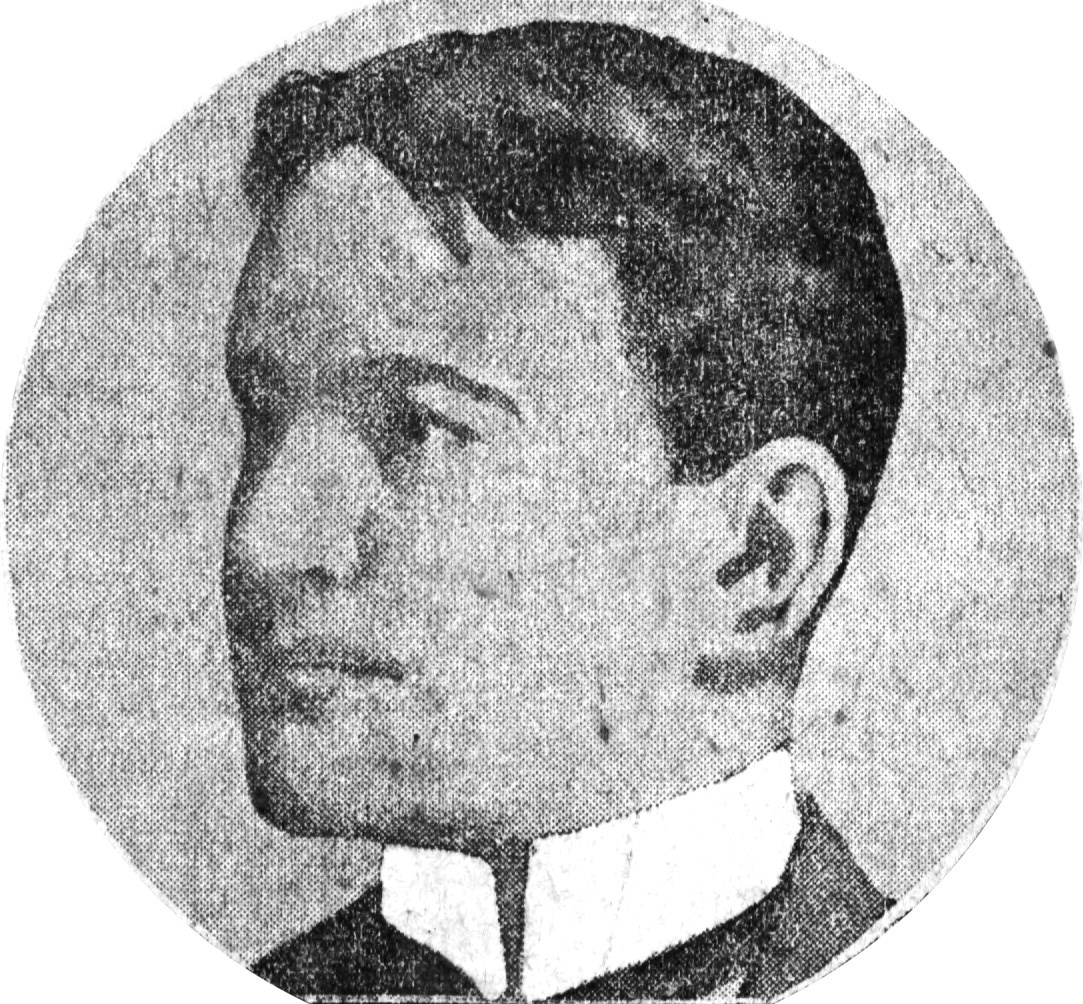
- Robert Livingston Gerry, c. 1899
- Born: Robert Livingston Gerry; May 31, 1877; New York, New York
- Died: October 31, 1957 (aged 80); Aknusti Estate, Delhi, New York
- Education: Cutler's School; Harvard University
- Occupations: Businessman; Racehorse owner/breeder
- Spouse: Cornelia Averell Harriman (m. 1908)
- Children: Elbridge T. Gerry Sr. Robert L. Gerry Jr. Edward Harriman Gerry; Henry Averell Gerry
- Parent(s): Elbridge Thomas Gerry; Louisa Matilda Livingston
- Relatives: Peter G. Gerry (brother)

Robert Livingston Gerry Sr. (May 31, 1877 – October 31, 1957) was an American businessman and owner of thoroughbred racehorses.

== Early life ==
Gerry was born on May 31, 1877, and was the son of Louisa Matilda Livingston (1836–1920) and Elbridge Thomas Gerry (1837–1927), founder of New York Society for the Prevention of Cruelty to Children. His younger brother was Peter G. Gerry (1879–1957), a U.S. Senator. He was the grandson of Thomas Russell Gerry, the great-grandson of Elbridge Gerry, a signer of the Declaration of Independence and the 5th Vice President of the United States of America, and the great-great-great-grandson of Francis Lewis, also a signer of the Declaration of Independence.

His mother was the granddaughter of Maturin Livingston (1769–1847) and Margaret Lewis (1780–1860). Margaret was the only child and sole heiress of Gov. Morgan Lewis (1754–1844), the governor of New York.

Robert attended Cutler's School in New York City and graduated from Harvard University in 1900.

== Career ==
Gerry was the owner of the Aknusti Estate in the Catskill Mountains of New York, adjoining his family's estate at Lake Delaware, New York. The Aknusti manor house was designed by architectural firm of Walker & Gillette with landscaping by the famed Olmsted Brothers firm.

Gerry served as a director of The Farmers Loan and Trust Company, a predecessor firm of Citigroup and kept his office at 258 Broadway in Manhattan.

=== Thoroughbred horse racing ===
He was a successful thoroughbred horse owner & breeder and a member of The Jockey Club. It has been published that he was the underbidder for Man o' War, at the auction won by Samuel D. Riddle at the Saratoga yearling sale in 1918. He bred and raced Thoroughbred horses under the name Aknusti Stable. Some of his racing successes include:

- Winner of the first ever running of the Test Stakes at Saratoga Race Course in 1922 as owner of the thoroughbred horse "Emotion". Trained by George M. Odom.
- Owner of "Lady Rosebud" which won the Demoiselle Stakes in 1918 at the old Empire City Race Track.
- Owner of "Cyclops" which won the Hartsdale Stakes in 1922 at the Empire City Race Track. Also won The Emerald Purse the same day as owner of the horse "Bee's Wax". Both horses trained by George M. Odom.
- Owner of "Peanuts" whose wins included the 1925 Saranac Stakes, the 1925 & 1926 Edgemere Handicap, the 1927 Brooklyn Handicap.
- Owner of "Voltaic" which ran in the Kentucky Derby in 1925. The trainer was George M. Odom.
- Owner of "Sarmaticus" which won the Toboggan Handicap at Aqueduct Race Track in 1926. Trained by George M. Odom.
- Co-owner of "High Strung" which won the Pimlico Futurity (now called Laurel Futurity) in 1928
- Owner of "Ironside" which won the Manhattan Handicap at Belmont Park in 1929. Trained by George M. Odom.
- Owner of "Straying" which won the Tomboy Handicap (by a neck) at Belmont Park in 1930. Trained by George M. Odom. "Straying" also won the Demoiselle Stakes in 1930.
- Owner of "Perpetuate" which won the Tremont Stakes in 1937. The jockey was James Stout.
- His wife, Cornelia, owned "Young Peter" which won the prestigious Travers Stakes in 1947. The trainer was George M. Odom. The jockey was Tommy May. Mrs. Gerry was ill and did not attend the race, but instead listened to the race on the radio from the Gerry family house at Aknusti.
- Wife, Cornelia, also won the Oceanport Stakes as owner of "Master Ace" in 1954.
- Owner of "Emotion" which won the Eclipse Award for 3 Year Old Filly in 1922.
- Owner of "Shoal" which finished third to Man o' War in the Hudson Stakes at Aqueduct in 1918.

He privately printed in 1931 at his own cost a detailed book on thoroughbred racehorses titled The Matriarchy of the American Turf for which he wrote the foreword. The book was authored by Marguerite F. Bayliss.

His daughter-in-law, Martha, was also involved in thoroughbred racing and was the owner of U.S. Racing Hall of Fame inductee, Forego. Martha Gerry was one of only five people ever named an Exemplar of Racing by the National Museum of Racing and Hall of Fame.

== Personal life ==
On March 3, 1908, he married Cornelia Averell Harriman (1884–1966) at Grace Church at 802 Broadway in New York City. Cornelia was the second daughter of railroad executive E. H. Harriman and his wife Mary Williamson Averell. Cornelia was the sister of W. Averell Harriman the New York Governor, E. Roland Harriman, and Mary Harriman, founder of the Junior League. They lived at the Aknusti Estate in Delhi, New York and at 69 East Seventy Ninth Street in New York City. Together Cornelia and Robert had:

- Elbridge T. Gerry Sr. (1908–1999), who married Marjorie Kane, in 1932. He became a nine-goal polo player and was involved with standardbred horses. He was elected to the Polo Hall of Fame and the Harness Racing Hall of Fame.
- Robert L. Gerry Jr. (1911–1979), who married Martha Leighton Kramer (d. 1993)
- Edward Harriman Gerry (1914–2003), who married Martha Farish (1918–2007), daughter of Standard Oil president, William Stamps Farish II, in 1939.
- Henry Averell Gerry (1914–2000), who married Nancy Whitney (1917–2012), daughter of Richard Whitney, in 1940.

In 1909, he founded the Lake Delaware Boys Camp, a summer camp for underprivileged boys outside of Delhi, NY, that is still in operation today. Gerry died at his home in Delhi, New York, on October 31, 1957, hours after his brother Peter died.

=== Descendants ===
Through his second son, Robert, he was the grandfather of Robert L. Gerry III (b. 1937), businessman and oil executive.
