= R. D. Whitehead Monument =

Public artwork by Sigvald Asbjornsen

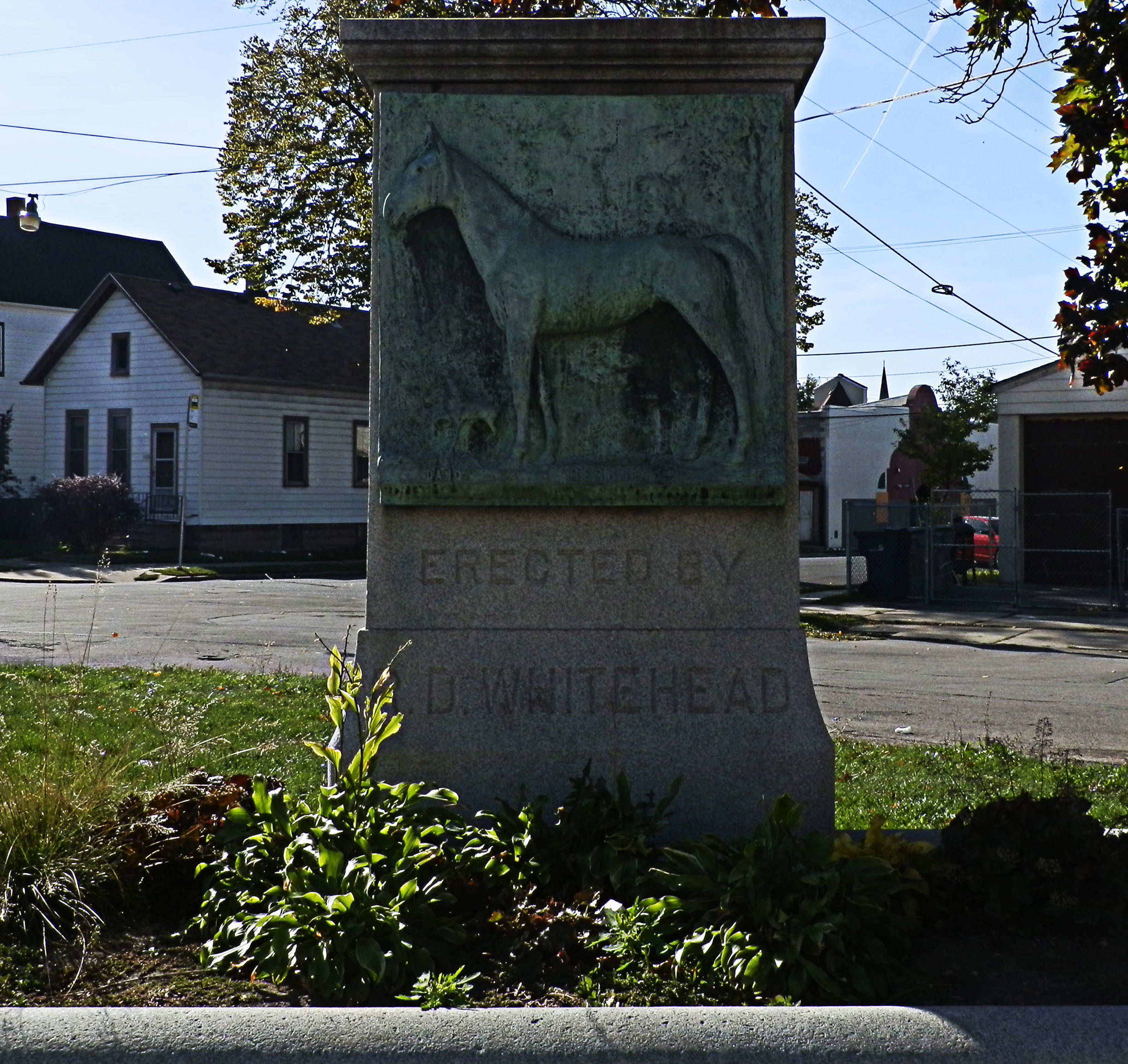
- Artist: Sigvald Asbjornsen
- Year: 1910
- Type: bronze and granite
- Dimensions: (35 1/2 in × 35 1/2 in × 3 1/2 in)
- Location: Milwaukee; 43°00′55.49″N 87°55′59.15″W
- Owner: Administered by the City of Milwaukee

The R. D. Whitehead Monument is a public artwork by Norwegian born American artist Sigvald Asbjornsen located on the south side of Milwaukee, Wisconsin, United States. The artwork consists of a bronze-relief plaque depicting a dog and horse, set on a granite pillar, which is in turn part of a fountain.

Short video of R. D. Whitehead Monument.

== Description ==
The R. D. Whitehead Monument, also known as the Horse and Dog Fountain and the Whitehead Memorial Fountain, was originally a watering trough, located in Milwaukee's South Side, that was converted into a fountain in 1966. There is a granite pillar rising from the fountain on which there is a bronze bas-relief. The bronze depicts a horse and a dog, both in profile. There are several inscriptions on the sculpture:

The bottom of the relief reads: DANDY GEORGE

The front of the pillar's base reads:

ERECTED BY
R. D. WHITEHEAD

The rear of the pillar's base reads:

ERECTED BY R. D. WHITEHEAD SUPT.
THE BADGER STATE HUMANE SOCIETY
IN REMEMBRANCE OF MY FAITHFUL FRIENDS
HORSE, GEORGE
DOGS, JIM, FLORA, DANDY, PET
PUNCH, JUDY & SHORTY
CATS, FRANK & HENRY
BIRDS, BROWNEY & DICK

A plaque affixed to the rear of the base reads:

R. D. WHITEHEAD MONUMENT
ORIGINALLY A HORSE WATERING TROUGH
ERECTED IN 1910
RESTORED AS A FOUNTAIN IN 1966
BY THE MAYOR'S BEAUTIFICATION COMMITTEE
DESIGNATED A MILWAUKEE LANDMARK IN 1974
IN RECOGNITION OF ITS HISTORICAL SIGNIFICANCE TO THE COMMUNITY

== Historical information ==
Richard D. Whitehead was appointed by the Humane Society as superintendent of the Wisconsin Humane Society in 1879, a position he filled for more than 25 years. The position called for Whitehead to investigate the cases of animal and child abuse referred to the organization. He grew up on a farm in Ohio and worked in a livery stable in Chicago, both experiences which made him aware of the mistreatment suffered by animals. Whitehead investigated more than 700 cases over the course of his career. These sometimes required that he exercise "his police powers in an effort to prevent further abuse". Whitehead left the Wisconsin Humane Society in 1906 and formed the short-lived Badger State Humane Society. Upon his retirement, he erected the R. D. Whitehead Memorial watering trough at as a memorial to all his faithful animals.

At the time that the R. D. Whitehead Memorial was completed, watering troughs were found at many intersections around Milwaukee. "This trough was particularly welcomed by horses that pulled wagonloads of produce to the Farmer's Market nearby on South 16th Street." It is the last watering trough left in the city of Milwaukee and became a City of Milwaukee Landmark in 1964. The trough was eventually turned into a water fountain in 1966. The animals depicted in the bas-relief, George the horse and Dandy the dog, were both animal friends of R. D. Whitehead. The animals listed on the plaque on the back of the monument are all animals the donor loved.

== Condition ==
In a survey conducted in April 1993, the sculpture was found to need treatment.

== See also ==
- Animalier
- Henry Bergh (sculpture)
