= Albert Parsells =

American polo player

Albert Parsells (1918-1954) was an American polo player.

== Biography ==
As a nine-goal player, he won two arena Senior Championships, a National Arena Chairman's Cup and a Monty Waterbury Cup. He served as manager of the Meadow Brook Polo Club and the Squadron A polo club.

He died of a heart attack while drowning on a private estate in Westbury, Long Island, N.Y. at the age of thirty-six.

He was inducted into the Museum of Polo and Hall of Fame on February 26, 1999.
