= Paul W. Barry =

American polo player

- Other name: "Uncle Bill"
- Occupation: Polo player

Paul W. Barry, a.k.a. Uncle Bill, was an American polo player.

== Biography ==
He held a seven-goal rating in 1948, 1949, 1955, 1956 and 1957. He won Camacho Cup as part of the USA team in 1946, the Butler Handicap in 1954, the National 20-Goal (Silver Cup) in 1954, the U.S. Open Polo Championship in 1955, and the National 12-Goal in 1957. He was known as a "cowboy" polo player because he came from the Western United States.

He was inducted into the Museum of Polo and Hall of Fame on February 17, 2006.
