= Stephen J. Roberts =

Polo coach

Stephen J. Roberts (1915–2005), also known as "Doc Roberts", was an American veterinarian, Professor at Cornell University, polo player and coach.

== Biography ==
=== Early life ===
Stephen Roberts was born in Indianapolis, Indiana on August 5, 1915. He grew up in Hamburg, New York, where his father, Dr James Roberts, a Cornell graduate, was a veterinarian. Roberts himself graduated from Cornell in 1938, where he trained as a veterinarian and served as Captain of the polo team. He married a Cornell graduated, Betty Jane Harris, in 1938. They moved to Manhattan, Kansas, where he taught veterinary medicine and earned his Master of Science.

=== Cornell ===
He joined the faculty at Cornell in 1942. He became full professor in the Department of Large Animal Medicine, Obstetrics and Surgery in 1946 and served as chairman of the department from 1965 to 1966, and from 1969 to 1972. He served on the Judicial Council of the American Veterinary Medical Association (AVMA) for thirteen years, was a charter diplomate of the American College of Theriogenologists, was an associate editor of the Veterinary News, and provided years of service to the Cornell Veterinary Alumni Association. He served as intercollegiate polo coach at Cornell from 1947 to 1972. He implemented "split strings" for intercollegiate polo, requiring home teams to provide horses so visitors didn't have to bring theirs to the game.

=== Vermont and retirement ===
In 1972, he left Cornell and moved to Woodstock, Vermont, where he worked as a veterinarian with his brother, Dr. James Roberts. He helped set up the Quechee Polo Club in Quechee, Vermont. In 1993, he married Ruth Webb Shipman and began retirement in Bath, New York. He died of heart failure on January 21, 2005, in Bath. His will had set up the Doc Roberts Fund for Polo.

=== Legacy ===
He received the prestigious national Borden Award from the AVMA for his research on cattle disease, the Distinguished Service Award from the New York State Veterinary Medical Society, and the Salmon Award given only to Cornell's most august veterinary alumni. He was inducted into the Cornell Athletic Hall of Fame in 1990. He was inducted into the Museum of Polo and Hall of Fame in Lake Worth, Florida on February 9, 1996.

== Bibliography ==
- Veterinary Obstetrics and Genital Diseases (1956)
- An Autobiographical History of Collegiate Polo and its Players at Cornell University, 1919-1972 and Beyond (1996)
