= Polo Ralph Lauren vs U.S. Polo Association =

American legal battle regarding trademark infringement

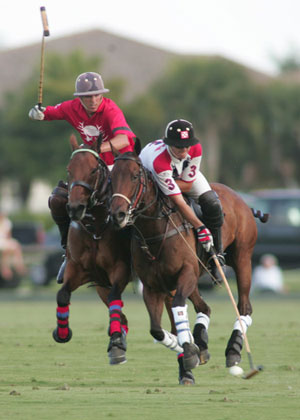
Polo player strike resembling both logos of both brands

Polo Ralph Lauren vs United States Polo Association became an ongoing legal battle after the first lawsuit in 1984. Ralph Lauren, the core designer and owner of the sportswear and fragrance line Polo Ralph Lauren of the Ralph Lauren Corporation, filed his first lawsuit against U.S. Polo Association, the governing body of the game of polo in the U.S., in 1984 on claims of trademark infringement. A series of lawsuits has since then been filed. USPA filed countersuits but the court had always ruled in favor of Ralph Lauren until a 2014 dismissal of Lauren's lawsuit. The two merchandise companies are currently disputing the use of the double horsemen logo used on a sunglass line launched by USPA.

== Lawsuits ==
The 1985 infringement claim was based on USPA's use of the word Polo on their retail clothing and fragrances as well as a logo similar to that of Polo Ralph Lauren. Polo Ralph Lauren, which was founded in 1967, began using a solid image of a horseman playing polo as their logo after the release of their men’s fragrance in 1978. A few years later, USPA released a men's fragrance in a similar dark blue package with a solid image of two horsemen playing polo as their logo. The judge ruled that USPA would be allowed to use the logo as so long as they make changes to clearly distinguish it from Polo Ralph Lauren so it does not confuse consumers. The Lauren company was granted the right to use trademarks that USPA argued were generic to the sport of polo.

In 1999, Ralph Lauren filed another lawsuit against USPA over their magazine which was titled Polo. The judge ruled in favor of Ralph Lauren and USPA was instructed to change the title of their magazine.

In the 2006 case, a Manhattan federal jury decided that USPA would avoid further infringement if they included their company name next to the logo. Options such as U.S. Polo Assn. and their founding date, 1890, were also deemed acceptable by the judge and Lauren. This ruling was upheld in 2008 by the 2nd Circuit U.S. Court of Appeals.

In November 2010, USPA filed a lawsuit against PRL (Polo Ralph Lauren) claiming that he was trying to monopolize a generic depiction of the sport of Polo. Judge Robert W. Sweet stated that licensing practices can be put into action so both parties do not run into further conflict but ruled against USPA noting that their double horsemen trademark used with the word "polo" is a matter of its own that can be classified as infringement.

Later in March 2011, Judge Sweet ruled in favor of PRL and the court issued a permanent injunction against USPA and rejected their request for a declaratory judgement that they could continue using the trademark.

In 2013, Polo Ralph Lauren filed a lawsuit against USPA and their textile firm, Arvind Limited, which manufactures and markets the USPA line in India.

A year later in 2014, USPA began selling sunglasses with the double horsemen logo between 2009 and 2012 and sold about 1 million pairs. In the 2014 case the judge ruled that USPA could be held in contempt for violating the terms of the previous injunction. USPA argued that the previous injunction did not prevent use of the mark across all markets, only clothing and fragrances. Both parties are awaiting further proceedings.

== Settlement ==
In June 2015, Arvind Limited settled the dispute from the lawsuit filed in 2013 by compensating Ralph Lauren Corporation 3.3 million dollars.
