= George Derville Rowlandson =

British painter (1861–1928)

George Derville Rowlandson (1861–1928) was a British painter. He is best known for his equestrian portraits. Some of his work can be found at the Museum of Polo and Hall of Fame in Lake Worth, Florida.

Rowlandson was born on 11 December 1861 in Secunderabad, Madras, India, the son of George Rowlandson an Indian Army colonel, and studied at the Gloucester Art School as well as the Westminster School of Art, London, and in Paris. He first worked as an illustrator, contributing works to The Illustrated London News between 1897 and 1900 and the English Illustrated Magazine from 1899 to 1900. He then exhibited oil paintings and watercolours at the British Institution and the Royal Institute of Painters in Watercolours between 1911 and 1918.

G.D.Rowlandson painted figure scenes, sporting subjects, landscapes and animals in both oils and watercolours. He is best known for his equestrian portraits, hunting scenes and military subjects and was one of the first official First World War artists.

In 1898 he married Manuela Francis Annie Cooke, daughter of Philip Cooke, a solicitor, in Newent, Gloucestershire. They had two sons George Philip, born in 1899 and Paulin Edward, born in 1904. The elder son died in action in 1918 during the First World War. The inscription chosen for George Philip's gravestone in Belgium was "GOD IS LOVE".

Rowlandson died on 23 December 1928, aged 67, in Hammersmith, London.
