= Massachusetts Society for the Prevention of Cruelty to Children =

The Massachusetts Society for the Prevention of Cruelty to Children (MSPCC) is a non-governmental charitable organization with offices in Boston and throughout Massachusetts which seeks to strengthen families and prevent child abuse through essential child welfare and mental health treatment and effective public advocacy.

== History ==
MSPCC was incorporated in 1878. Henry Bergh, originally a founder of the American Society for the Prevention of Cruelty to Animals (ASPCA), and then of the New York Society for the Prevention of Cruelty to Children (the first such organisation in the world) was also active in the MSPCC's founding. Bergh got involved in child welfare when he was approached by a Methodist missionary named Etta Agnell Wheeler who was seeking help rescuing a child, Mary Ellen Wilson, from an extremely abusive home. After Wilson's story was heard, other complaints came in to Bergh. In response, he and Elbridge Thomas Gerry formed the New York Society in 1874; the Massachusetts society was formed shortly after.

== Today ==
Mary McGeown is MSPCC's president and CEO.

Its programs include pregnancy and parenting support, child and family counseling, and support for foster and adoptive families.

It monitors public policy issues at the state legislative and executive levels, and promotes the needs of children and adolescents in the areas of child abuse, foster care, poverty and welfare, and mental, physical and dental health, as well as the needs of teens who have "aged out" of foster care.

In 2006, MSPCC helped develop the Connecting With Care program which is a school-based collaborative that provides mental health services for children and families living in high poverty and high crime areas.

MSPCC serves children and families throughout the state through home visits and service sites in Boston, Holyoke, Lawrence, Lowell, and Worcester.

== See also ==
- New York Society for the Prevention of Cruelty to Children
