= Henry Bergh =

American activist (1813–1888)

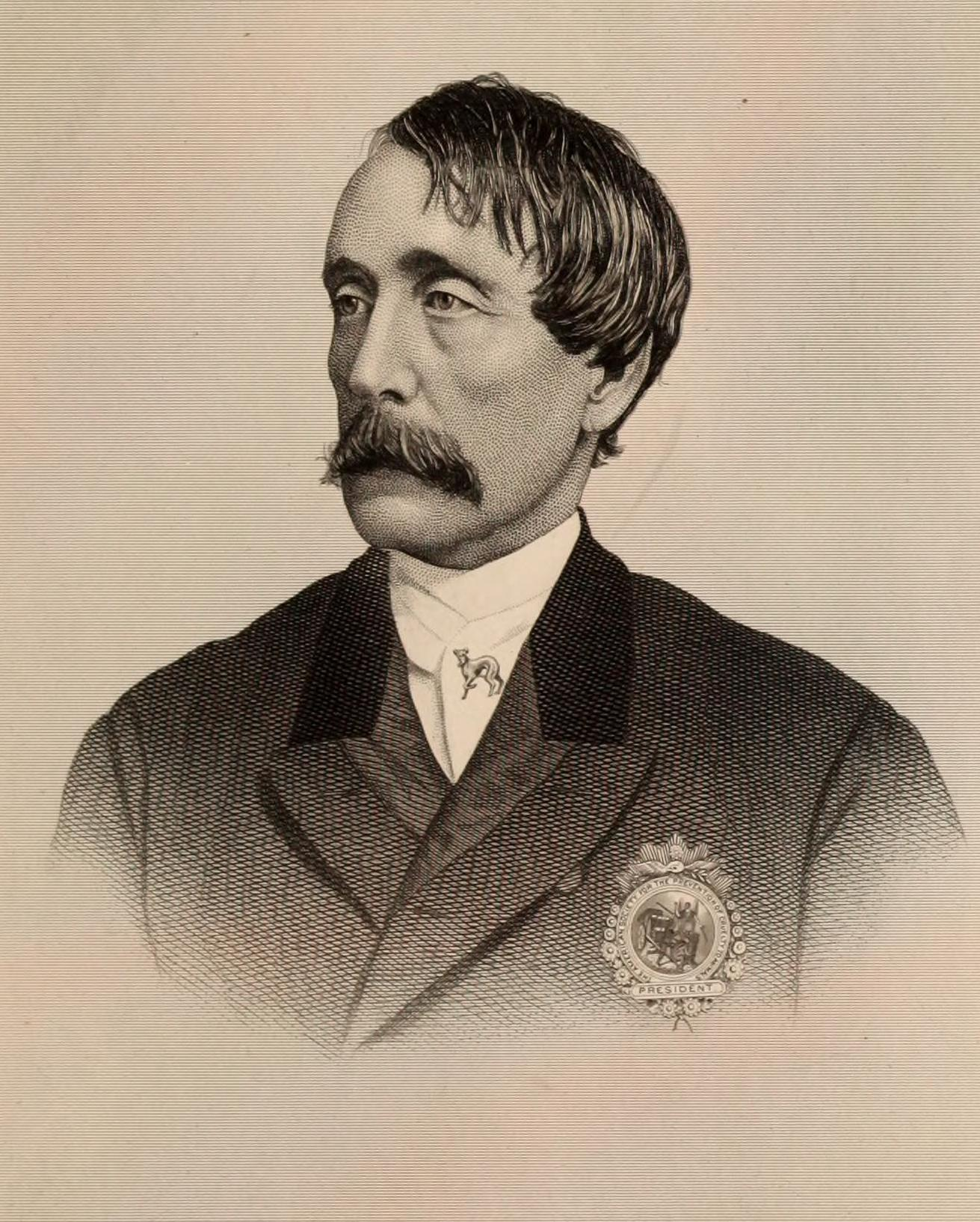
- Bergh by George Edward Perine
- Born: Henry Bergh; August 29, 1813; New York City, US
- Died: March 12, 1888 (aged 74); New York City, US
- Education: Columbia College
- Occupations: Diplomat, activist for humane treatment of animals and children
- Known for: Founding the American Society for the Prevention of Cruelty to Animals, helping found the Massachusetts Society for the Prevention of Cruelty to Children
- Spouse: Catherine Matilda Taylor
- Parents: Christian Bergh (father); Elizabeth Ivers (mother)

Signature
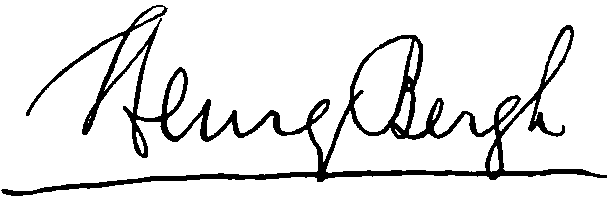

Henry Bergh (August 29, 1813 – March 12, 1888) founded the American Society for the Prevention of Cruelty to Animals (ASPCA) in April, 1866, three days after the first effective legislation against animal cruelty in the United States was passed into law by the New York State Legislature. Bergh also prompted the formation, in 1874, of the New York Society for the Prevention of Cruelty to Children (NYSPCC).

== Life ==
Henry Bergh was born August 29, 1813, in New York City, to Christian Bergh III and Elizabeth Bergh. His father, an ethnic German, was a successful shipbuilder who had completed a series of contracts for the government. Henry Bergh joined his father in 1835 at the C. Bergh & Co., shipbuilding business. Upon his death in 1843, he left a large estate to the benefit of the three Bergh children, including Henry.

Bergh attended Columbia College in New York City, but left before completing his degree, deciding instead to tour Europe, where he remained for five years.

In 1862 Bergh entered government service when President Abraham Lincoln appointed him secretary of the U.S. legation in Tsarist Russia. He served time in St. Petersburg as acting vice-consul. He resigned his position in 1864 owing to Russia's severe winter weather.

=== Advocacy ===
==== Animal welfare ====
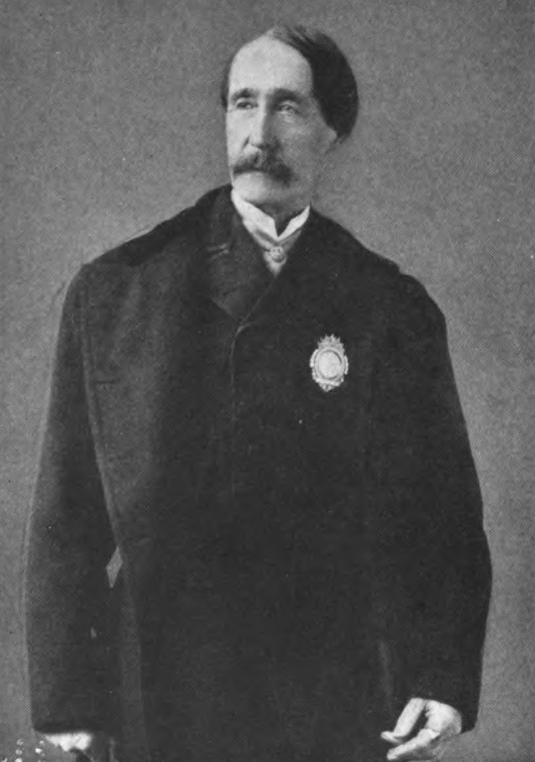
Bergh, unknown date

During his stay in Europe, Bergh witnessed various cruelties committed upon animals, which affected him greatly. In England Bergh met Lord Harrowby, president of the Royal Society for the Prevention of Cruelty to Animals, who impressed upon Bergh the importance of his mission, leading Bergh to dedicate the rest of his life to the cause of ending animal cruelty.

On April 10, 1866, an act of incorporation of the American Society for the Prevention of Cruelty to Animals (ASPCA) was granted by the New York state legislature, with Bergh assuming the role of president of the new association, for which he received no financial compensation. Bergh and his wife provided initial funding for the private organization, but after some time Bergh was requested to meet an old man in a hospital, Louis Bonard, a rich Frenchman who had earned a fortune trading animal furs. Bonard was full of praise for Bergh's work. He wanted to leave a fortune of $100,000 to the society. He said to Bergh, "I shall help you! Only if you promise that if ever you have the power, you will extend your protection to the wild things of forest and plain." Bergh promised and accepted the $100,000. Branches of the ASPCA were subsequently established throughout the United States and Canada.

Under Bergh's leadership, the early ASPCA involved itself in a wide variety of issues, including slaughterhouse practices, animal transportation, care of horses, elimination of vivisection, cock fighting, and dog fighting, and the abolition of use of live pigeons in shooting matches. Bergh and the ASPCA are particularly credited for the use of clay pigeons in trap shooting.

During the 1872 outbreak of horse flu, Bergh stood wearing a top hat in the middle of New York City's streets and stopped horse-drawn trolleys and wagons being pulled by sick animals, sending them back to their stables. Although he was threatened with lawsuits by transit companies, his advocacy raised the profile of the cause.

In 1873, Bergh conducted a national lecture tour taking him across the American West. He was also able to speak on the animal welfare cause before the Evangelical Alliance and the Episcopal convention, with the latter passing a resolution giving its clergy express permission to preach an annual sermon against cruelty to animals.

==== Child welfare ====
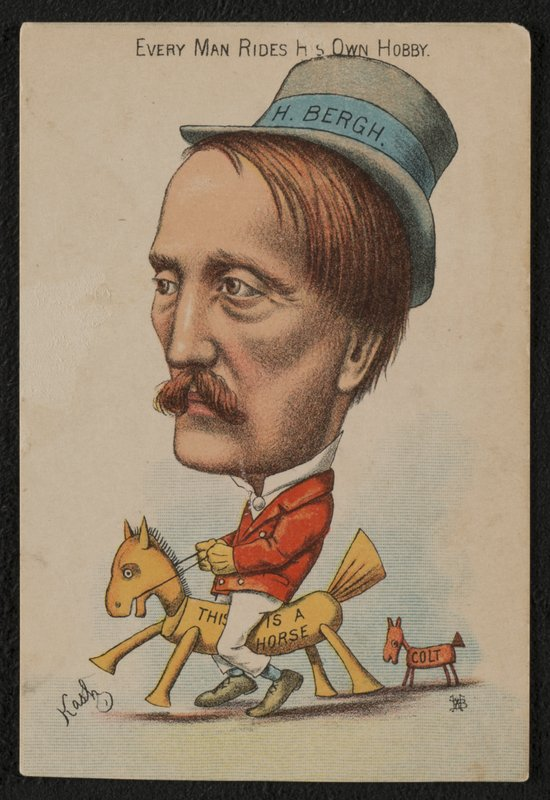
Trading card depicting Bergh by Cassius Marcellus Coolidge, c. 1870–1900

In 1874, Bergh was approached by a Methodist missionary named Etta Agnell Wheeler, who sought help rescuing a child named Mary Ellen Wilson from her cruel abuser, Mary Connolly. After Mary Ellen's story was heard, and she was subsequently rescued through Bergh's efforts, other complaints came in to Bergh. In response, Bergh himself, along with Elbridge T. Gerry and John D. Wright, formed the New York Society for the Prevention of Cruelty to Children (NYSPCC) in 1875. Over the coming years, other SPCC organizations were formed, such as the Massachusetts organization in 1888, the Massachusetts Society for the Prevention of Cruelty to Children (MSPCC).

== Death and legacy ==
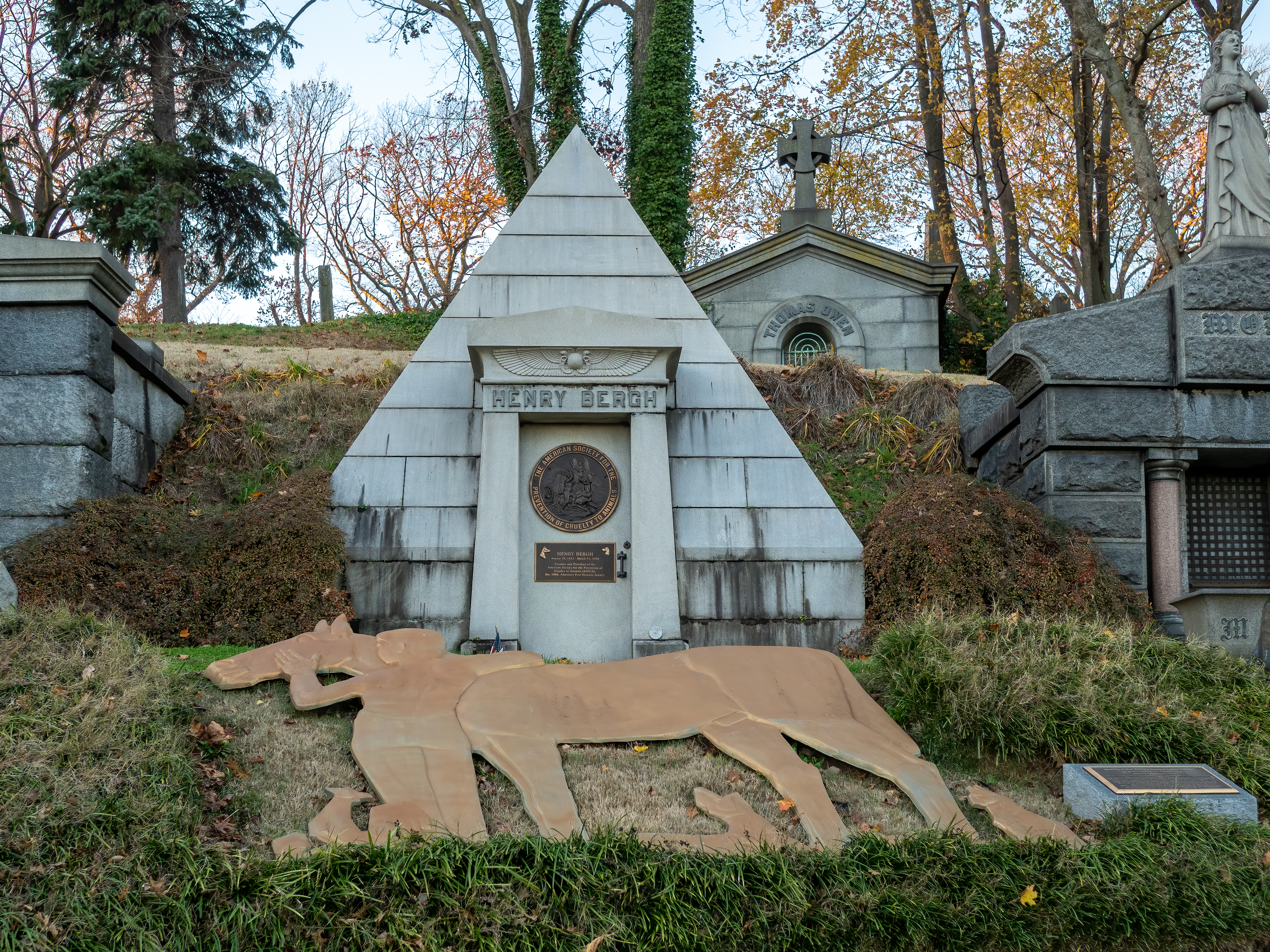
Bergh's mausoleum at Green-Wood Cemetery in Brooklyn, New York City

Bergh died on March 12, 1888, in New York City. Poet Henry Wadsworth Longfellow eulogized Bergh as "among the noblest in the land, Though he may count himself the least, That man I honour and revere, Who without favour, without fear, In the great city dares to stand The friend to every friendless beast." Henry Bergh is interred at Green-Wood Cemetery in Brooklyn, New York.

A 1982 children's book about Bergh, The Man Who Loved Animals, was written by Syd Hoff.

In the spring of 2006 at Green-Wood Cemetery, while making preparations to honor Bergh, the ASPCA discovered that his wife was also in that mausoleum. On May 6, substantive ceremonies were held before a large audience which was allowed to bring their pets into the cemetery – including dogs, for the first time in over a century. The NYPD Emerald Society bagpipers and ASPCA HLE Agents were there also. After a walk to Bergh's tomb, the bas-relief statue was revealed that now rests in front. At the same time as these ceremonies, in the cemetery's large chapel building an exhibit was opened celebrating the history of the ASPCA and Henry Bergh.

== Literary works ==
=== Tales and sketches ===
- "The Streets of New York"
- "The Portentous Telegram"
- "The Ocean Paragon"

=== Plays ===
- A Decided Scamp
- An Extraordinary Envoy
- Peculiar People
- Love's Alternative

=== Poetry ===
- Married Off (1859), a long poem

== See also ==
- Henry Bergh (sculpture), an 1891 statue by American artist James H. Mahoney
