= Philip L. B. Iglehart =

Chilean polo player

Philip L. B. Iglehart (1913 – February 9, 1993) was a Chilean American polo player.

== Biography ==
Philip Iglehart was born in Chile in 1913. He was educated at the Lawrence School in New York City, the Aiken Preparatory School in Aiken, South Carolina, St. Paul's School in New Hampshire and Yale University.

During the Second World War, he served as Vice President for operations in the Pacific Ocean of Grace Lines, a shipping company. He then operated a cattle ranch and orange groves near Lake Okeechobee, Florida. From 1964 until 1974, he owned a farm near the Baltimore Country Club in Baltimore, Maryland.

He established the Gulfstream Polo Club in Lake Worth, Florida. He helped find a new location for the Meadowbrook Polo Club after it was taken by the construction of a highway. In 1988, he founded the Museum of Polo and Hall of Fame alongside H. Jeremy Chisholm, Leverett S. Miller, and George C. Sherman, Jr.

He had two sons and one daughter. His brother was Stewart Iglehart. He lived in Lake Worth, Florida.
