= Mary Ellen Wilson =

American child abuse victim (1864–1956)

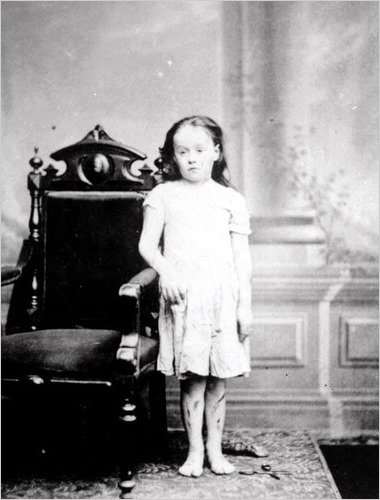
- Wilson (a/k/a McCormack) in 1874
- Born: March 1864; New York City, U.S.
- Died: October 30, 1956 (aged 92); New York City, U.S.
- Spouse: Lewis Schutt (m. 1888)

Mary Ellen Wilson (March 1864 – October 30, 1956), also called Mary Ellen McCormack, was an American victim of child abuse whose case led to the creation of the New York Society for the Prevention of Cruelty to Children, the first child protection agency in the world. At the age of eight, she was severely abused by her foster parents, Francis and Mary Connolly. Because she was assisted by Henry Bergh, then the head of the American Society for the Prevention of Cruelty to Animals, some sources incorrectly state that statutes against cruelty to animals had to be used to remove her from the home. Hers was the first case of child abuse in the United States to be thoroughly documented.

== Biography ==
Mary Ellen was born in March 1864 to Frances Connor Wilson and Thomas Wilson of Hell's Kitchen in New York City. Frances Connor emigrated from England to New York City in 1858 and met Irishman Thomas Wilson. The couple married in April 1862, soon after Thomas was drafted into the 69th New York, a regiment of the Irish Brigade. Following Thomas's death during the American Civil War, Frances had to take a job, and was no longer able to stay at home to raise Mary Ellen. She boarded her with a woman named Martha Score. When Frances Wilson's financial situation worsened, she was no longer able to make child care payments to Score. Now almost two, Score turned Mary Ellen into the New York City Department of Charities.

Thomas and Mary McCormack, a married couple, had lost three children to diseases bred from poverty. McCormack boasted he had fathered children by another woman, and on January 2, 1866, the McCormacks went to the Department of Charities and claimed Mary Ellen was Thomas McCormack's daughter. The Department of Charities placed Mary Ellen into the McCormacks' care. Thomas McCormack signed an "indenture" agreement upon retrieving Mary Ellen from the Department of Charities' care. The McCormacks were required to report the child's condition annually to the department, but this only occurred once or twice during Mary Ellen's stay.

Shortly after gaining custody of the girl, Thomas McCormack died. Mary then married Francis Connolly.

== Investigation into abuse ==
The Connollys and Mary Ellen moved to an apartment on West 41st Street. It was at this address that neighbors first became aware of young Mary Ellen's mistreatment. Her foster mother forced her to do heavy labor. Also repeatedly beating, burning, and cutting the child and locking her in a closet. When the Connollys moved to a new address, one of the concerned neighbors from their 41st Street apartment asked Etta Angell Wheeler, a Methodist missionary who worked in the area, to check in on the child. Under the pretext of asking Mrs. Connolly's help in caring for Connolly's new neighbor, the chronically ill and home-bound Mary Smitt, Etta gained access to the Connollys' apartment to witness Mary Ellen's state for herself. When Ms. Wheeler saw evidence of severe physical abuse, malnourishment, and neglect in Mary Ellen's condition—she was seen barefoot in the winter, for example—Etta began to research legal options to redress the abuse and protect the young girl. After finding the local authorities reluctant to act upon the child cruelty laws currently in place, she turned to a local advocate for the animal humane movement and the founder of the American Society for the Prevention of Cruelty to Animals, Henry Bergh. With the help of neighbors' testimony, Wheeler and Bergh removed Mary Ellen from the Connolly home using a writ of homine replegiando and took Mary Connolly to trial.

== New York State Supreme Court ==
Elbridge Thomas Gerry of American Society for the Prevention of Cruelty to Animals took her case to the New York State Supreme Court in 1874. At the time of the trial, Mary Ellen was ten years of age.

The deliberate cruelties and deprivations inflicted on Mary Ellen Wilson by her adopted parents included the following:

- regular and severe beatings with a rawhide
- burnings
- struck with scissors
- insufficient food
- being forced to sleep on the floor
- having no warm clothes to wear in cold weather
- being frequently left alone inside a darkened, locked room
- being forbidden to go outdoors, except at night in her own yard
- forced to do heavy labor

On April 9, 1874, Mary Ellen, now aged 10, testified in court regarding the abuse she had suffered:

My father and mother are both dead. I don’t know how old I am. I have no recollection of a time when I did not live with the Connollys. Mamma has been in the habit of whipping and beating me almost every day. She used to whip me with a twisted whip—a rawhide. The whip always left a black and blue mark on my body. I have now the black and blue marks on my head which were made by Mamma and also a cut on the left side of my forehead which was made by a pair of scissors. She struck me with the scissors and cut me; I have no recollection of ever having been kissed by any one—have never been kissed by Mamma. I have never been taken on my mamma's lap and caressed or petted. I never dared to speak to anybody, because if I did, I would get whipped. I do not know for what I was whipped—Mamma never said anything to me when she whipped me. I do not want to go back to live with Mamma, because she beats me so. I have no recollection ever being on the street in my life.

A jury convicted Mrs. Connolly of assault and battery and the judge sentenced her to one year in prison. That year, the New York Society for the Prevention of Cruelty to Children was founded, the first organization of its kind.

== Later life and death ==
Following the conviction of Mary Connolly, Mary Ellen was initially placed in a juvenile home before Etta Wheeler and her relatives successfully obtained custody of her. Wheeler later wrote:

The child was an interesting study, so long shut within four walls and now in a new world. Woods, fields, 'green things growing,' were all strange to her, she had not known them. She had to learn, as a baby does, to walk upon the ground – she had walked only upon floors, and her eye told her nothing of uneven surfaces.

In 1888, when Mary Ellen was twenty-four, she married Lewis Schutt, a widower with three children. They had two daughters, Etta (named after the woman who rescued Mary Ellen), and Florence. The couple also adopted an orphaned girl named Eunice. Her daughter Florence remembered Mary Ellen as being solemn, but someone who "came alive whenever she listened to Irish jigs and especially to "The Irish Washerwoman." She lived to the age of 92, and died on October 30, 1956.

== See also ==
- Child abuse
- Physical abuse
- Timeline of young people's rights in the United States
