= Gerald Ryan =

Gerald Ryan may refer to:

- Gerald J. Ryan (1887–1917), Australian rules footballer
- Gerald P. Ryan (1895–1974), Australian rules footballer
- Gerald Augustine John Ryan, American bishop

== See also ==
- Gerry Ryan (disambiguation)
