= Lewis A. Smith =

American polo player

Lewis A. Smith was an American polo player.

== Biography ==
Smith was a nine-goal player. He played in East Aurora, New York for the Knox family. He won the Cup of the Americas in 1950, playing again in 1966 and 1969. He also won a National Twenty-Goal title. He competed in the U.S. Open Polo Championship.

He was inducted into the Museum of Polo and Hall of Fame in Lake Worth, Florida on February 7, 1997.
