= De homine replegiando =

Legal remedy used to liberate a person from unlawful detention

De homine replegiando (literally "personal replevin") is a legal remedy used to liberate a person from unlawful detention on bail, "with a view to try the question of the validity of the law under which he is held in confinement." More broadly, the term can also apply to cases where a person is not imprisoned by the state, such as in the case of Mary Ellen Wilson.

It is the oldest common law freedom writ.

== Procedure ==
The writ is "of common right, and may be issued as of course." Once issued, a judicial order is directed to a sheriff or a deputy ordering the replevy of the prisoner in exchange for security that they will reappear for a proceeding challenging their detention.

== Etymology ==
The French word replegiando or “revendication” is derived from the Latin word replegiare meaning "pledge back."
