= Gerry O'Connor =

Gerry O'Connor may refer to:

- Gerry O'Connor (fiddler), Irish fiddle player
- Gerry O'Connor (banjo player) (born 1960), tenor banjo player
- Gerry O'Connor (hurling manager) (born 1966), Irish hurling manager and former player

== See also ==
- Jerry O'Connor (born 1979), Irish hurler
- Jerry L. O'Connor (born 1953), Wisconsin state legislator
- Jeremy O'Connor (sailor) (born 1955), Zimbabwean Olympic sailor
- Gerry Connor (1932–1993), cricketer
- Gerald O'Connor (1890–1949), Alberta politician
- Jerome Murphy-O'Connor (1935–2013), priest and theologian
