= Gerry Ryan (disambiguation) =

Gerry Ryan (1956–2010) was an Irish presenter.

Gerry Ryan may also refer to:

- Gerry Ryan (footballer) (1955–2023), Irish footballer
- Gerry Ryan (businessman) (born 1949/1950), Australian businessman

== See also ==
- Jeri Ryan (born 1968), actress
- Gerald Ryan (disambiguation)
