= Gerry Connor =

Australian cricketer

Personal information
- Born: 15 September 1932; Perth, Western Australia
- Died: 5 September 1993 (aged 60); Perth, Western Australia
- Source: Cricinfo, 12 March 2016

Gerald O'Grady Connor (15 September 1932 – 5 September 1993) was an Australian first-class cricketer who played for 10 first-class matches for Western Australia and Tasmania. He was born and died in Perth, Western Australia.
