= Gerry Sharpe =

Gerry Sharpe may refer to:

- Gerry Sharpe (photographer)
- Gerry Sharpe (footballer)
