= Robert L. Gerry Jr. =

American polo player

- Born: Robert Livingston Gerry Jr. December 5, 1911; New York City, U.S.
- Died: December 21, 1979 (aged 68); New York City, U.S.
- Occupations: Businessman, polo player
- Spouses: Martha Leighton Kramer; Harriet Wells
- Children: Nancy Gerry; Robert L. Gerry III
- Parent(s): Robert L. Gerry, Sr. Cornelia Averell Harriman
- Relatives: Elbridge T. Gerry (grandfather); E. H. Harriman (grandfather); Mary W. Averell (grandmother); Peter G. Gerry (uncle); W. Averell Harriman (uncle)

Robert Livingston Gerry Jr. (December 5, 1911 – December 21, 1979) was an American polo player and heir to both the prominent Gerry and Harriman families.

== Early life ==
Gerry was born in New York City on December 5, 1911, to Robert L. Gerry Sr. and Cornelia Harriman. His eldest brother was Elbridge T. Gerry, Sr. and his younger twin brothers were Henry Averell Gerry and Edward Harriman Gerry. Robert's father, a successful real estate developer, died at the family's estate, Aknusti, at the age of 81 on October 31, 1957, just a few hours after his brother, former U. S. Senator Peter Goelet Gerry, died in Providence, Rhode Island.

=== Family ===
Robert L. Gerry Jr. was the nephew of U.S. Senator Peter Goelet Gerry, Governor W. Averell Harriman, Junior League founder Mary Harriman, and E. Roland Harriman. His maternal grandfather was railroad baron E.H. Harriman and his paternal great-great grandfather was Thomas Russell Gerry, his great-great grandfather was Elbridge Gerry, a signer of the Declaration of Independence and Vice President of the United States.

== Sporting career ==
=== Polo career ===
In 1929, he won the USPA Open National Interscholastic Championship. In 1933, he won the USPA Junior Championship and in 1938, he won the USPA Twenty Goal Championship. In 1938, he won the Monty Waterbury Memorial Cup.

Gerry was a renowned polo player. He won the US Open Polo Championship twice, first in 1939 playing the #2 position for the Bostwick Field team, and second, in 1940 playing the #2 position for the Aknusti team. He lost in finals of 1941 championship while playing for the Aknusti team. From 1923 to 1941, all U.S. Open Polo Championship were played at Meadow Brook on Long Island, New York.

The 1939 Bostwick Field team included Pete Bostwick, Robert L. Gerry Jr., Elbridge T. Gerry Sr., Eric Horace Tyrrell-Martin. In the 1940 U.S. Open Polo Championship final, the Aknusti team beat Great Neck. The final score was a close 5 to 4. Playing for Aknusti that year were Gerald Smith, Robert L. Gerry Jr., Elbridge Gerry, and Alan Corey Jr. The 1941 Aknusti team was composed of Elbridge T. Gerry Sr., Robert L. Gerry Jr., Edward H. Gerry, and Pete Bostwick. In the U.S. Open finals, they played against Gulf Stream whose riders were Michael Grace Phipps, Ben Phipps, Charles Skiddy von Stade, and Alan L. Corey Jr., who beat Aknusti 10–6.

=== Tennis career ===
Gerry was also, an accomplished Court tennis player. He won the Tuxedo Gold Racquet Singles Champion in 1946, as well as the U.S. Amateur Doubles Championship in both 1949 and 1950 playing with Alastair Martin. He was a Charter Member of the United States Court Tennis Association.

== Personal life ==
Gerry married Martha Leighton Kramer, daughter of A. Ludlow Kramer. Together, they had:

- Nancy Gerry (born 1935)
- Robert L. Gerry III (born 1937)

He later married Harriet Wells.

Gerry inherited family lands in the Catskills, and added to them to create the sprawling 2,000-acre (8.1 km^{2}) estate "Aknusti" (later renamed 'Broadlands'). It has acreage in the townships of Andes, Delhi, and Bovina, New York. It is an almost contiguous estate with a polo field, multiple working farms, a 20,000 sq ft (1,900 m^{2}). mountain-ridge sited colonial manor house designed by Walker & Gillette, numerous dependencies, and landscaping done by Frederick Law Olmsted. Gerry owned the property until his death. The property has since been sold multiple times, although it remains intact and owned by Amanresorts. He died in 1979.
