= Robert E. Walton =

American polo player and coach

Robert E. Walton, is an American polo player and coach.

He has won the US Handicap, the Sunshine League, the Pacific Coast Open, the Silver Cup, the Monty Waterbury Cup, the America Cup, the US Arena Handicap, and the Interscholastic Arena Championship. While attending the University of California, Davis he won the 1978 National USPA Intercollegiate Championship with his brothers FD Walton and Bil Walton professional polo player. Internationally, he has won the Westchester Cup, the Coronation Cup, the Queen's Cup, and the Mexican Open Handicap.

In 1995, he suffered an injury after falling off his horse in Malaysia, thus ending his career as a player. He is paralysed from the neck down, and uses a wheelchair. He is now a polo coach. He has paved the way for the creation of the Polo Players Support Group, which takes care of polo players who suffer injuries.

He was inducted into the Museum of Polo and Hall of Fame in Lake Worth, Florida on March 3, 2000.

His son, Del Walton, currently rated three goals, plays polo and owns Walton Farm a breeding and training farm in South Carolina for polo horses.
