= John P. Kane Mansion =

Historic house in New York, United States

- U.S. National Register of Historic Places
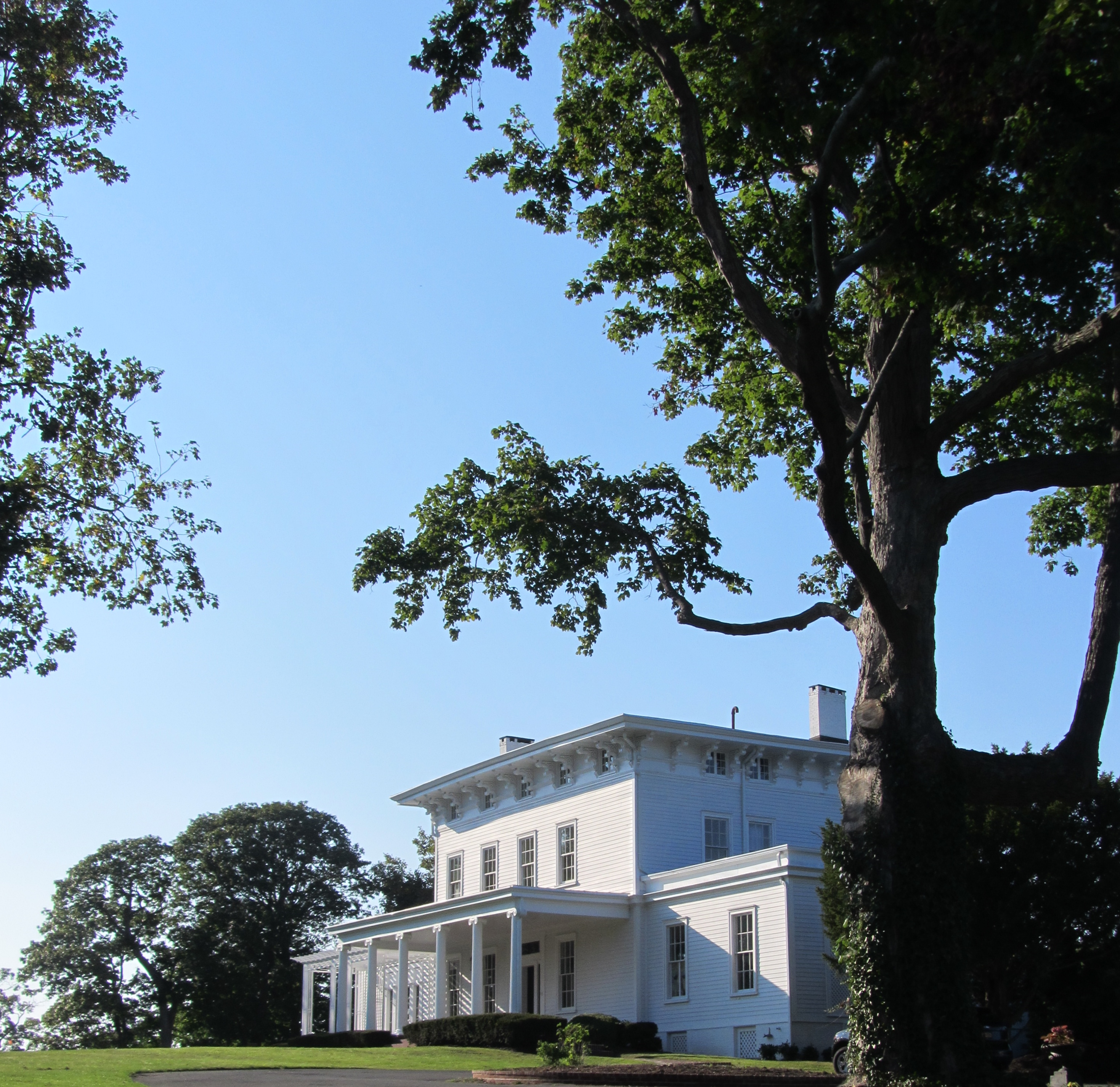

- Location within New York Location within the United States
- Location: 37 Kanes Ln., Huntington Bay, New York
- Coordinates: 40°53′54″N 73°25′15″W
- Area: 1.7 acres (0.69 ha)
- Built: 1850
- Architectural style: Italianate
- MPS: Huntington Town MRA
- NRHP reference No.: 85002580
- Added to NRHP: September 26, 1985

John P. Kane Mansion, also known as High Lindens, is a historic home located at Huntington Bay in Suffolk County, New York. It was built about 1850 and is a three-story, flat roofed clapboard residence with deep overhanging eaves on massive scrollsawn brackets which frame frieze windows. It is representative of the Italianate style.

It was added to the National Register of Historic Places in 1985.

The main part of this house was built in 1843 by Dr. Rheinlander. The porches and side wings were added on by the Kanes in 1850.
