= Etta Angell Wheeler =

American child abuse activist (1834–1921)

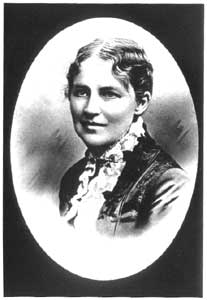
Wheeler

Etta Angell Wheeler (June 14, 1834 – December 5, 1921) was the rescuer and advocate of Mary Ellen Wilson, whose infamous abuse story led to the creation of the New York Society for the Prevention of Cruelty to Children. Wheeler was also influential in the society's creation because she convinced future founder of the society, Henry Bergh, who at the time was founder of the American Society for the Prevention of Cruelty to Animals, to take on the issue and spearhead the case.

== Background ==
Marietta Angell was born in Spencerport, New York, a suburb area of Rochester. She resided with her mother, Sally Angell, and sister Elizabeth Spencer, and it was here she met Charles Wheeler, whom she married. Charles Wheeler later inherited a moderate home from his deceased father in New York, New York.

== Career ==
In New York City, Etta Wheeler was a Methodist missionary of St. Luke's Mission for the poor. Her work consisted of going to poor parishioners of her church and providing meals, supplies, and donations from the mission. She further added to her duties by checking in on individuals, conversing with them, and providing aid around their homes. She was assigned two routes; between West 38th Street and West 42nd Street and between 47th Street and 53rd Street. These areas that were later referred to as Hell's Kitchen. When able, Wheeler extended her care to those who were not part of the church.

Charles Wheeler was a reporter for the New York Daily News, a position which he held for more than 12 years. While her husband worked long hours at the paper, Etta was consumed with her work for the mission and she devoted her life to the church and taking care of the needy. Once married, the Wheelers decided against having any children because they believed there were already too many unloved children in the world. The Wheelers lived outside the slums.

== Role as rescuer ==
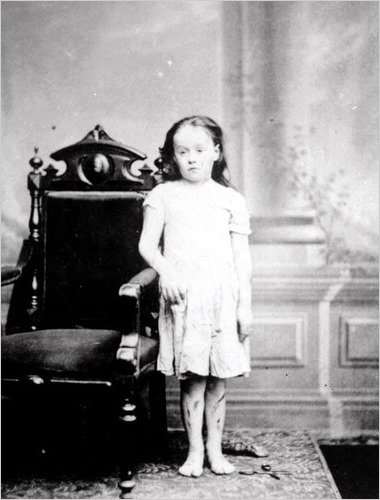
Mary Ellen Wilson, also known as Mary Ellen McCormack, in 1874

It was on one of her rounds on 41st Street, in December 1873, that a tenant of a building approached Wheeler and spoke of a family, the Connollys, that once resided there. They apparently had with them a little daughter that was barely seen but her screams and the mother's, Mary Connolly, brutality, were often heard.

Within the week Wheeler paid the family a visit at their new location under the pretense that she wanted to speak to them about an ill neighbor adjacent them. All the while, Wheeler paid close attention to the child who was present in the back of the room washing dishes.

I saw a pale, thin child, barefoot, in a thin, scanty dress so tattered that I could see she wore but one garment besides. It was December and the weather bitterly cold. ……..Across the table lay a brutal whip of twisted leather strands and the child's meager arms and legs bore many marks of its use.

— Etta Wheeler

After her initial contact with the family, Wheeler spoke to Pastor Frank Jameson about how to intervene on the child's behalf, but was told that they could not interfere. In search of other options, she spent numerous months trying to locate an agency that would assist her in removing the child from the home, but of the dozens of children's charities she contacted she was told that they were not allowed to interfere in family matters. The most these agencies could do was donate clothing; they lacked the power to remove the child from guardian custody. The New York police told her that there was a law that prevented the removal of a child from their guardian without sufficient evidence.

Her niece informed her that she should be talking to Henry Bergh, the founder of American Society for the Prevention of Cruelty to Animals. On April 7, 1874 Wheeler met with Bergh and conveyed the story of the abused girl and asked for his assistance. Bergh reiterated the statements of the police, and said that if Wheeler provided evidence, she might have a case.

That day Etta Wheeler went to both buildings where the Connolly family lived in the past few months, collecting witnesses and documenting the incidents of suspected child abuse. The next day she had formulated a detailed letter to Bergh providing evidence and testimonies from numerous witnesses. Wheeler's thorough investigation provided sufficient evidence for Bergh to present to a Supreme Court Judge which not only granted them a case but also grounds to remove Mary Ellen Wilson and apprehend her mother.

== Influences ==
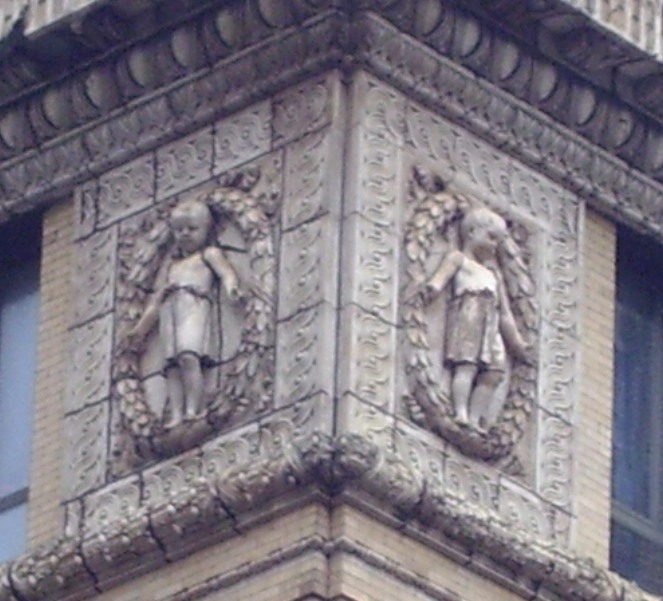
A detail from the facade of 295 Park Avenue South at 23rd Street in the Flatiron District of Manhattan, New York City, built in 1892 as the headquarters of the New York Society for the Prevention of Cruelty to Children. The building was designed by Renwick, Aspinwall & Renwick.

The trial of Mary Ellen was very popular. It held continuous headlines in the media and drew much publicity. Wheeler's husband was a reporter for a newspaper and may have helped contribute to the media coverage of the case. Wheeler testified during the trial, attended every court proceeding, and was Mary Ellen Wilson's advocate.

On April 27, 1874, Mary Connolly was found guilty of one count of assault with intent to kill. Wheeler then asked Bergh about creation of a society for the prevention of cruelty to children. On December 15, 1874, the New York Society for the Prevention of Cruelty to Children was established with co-founders Henry Bergh and Elbridge T Gerry, the prosecutor of Mary Ellen Wilson's case.

Directly after the trial, Wheeler fought to ensure the child was placed in an adequate home and appealed to the judge to have Mary Ellen placed with her family in upstate New York. Henry Bergh wrote a character reference letter to the Supreme Court judge. Mrs. Wheeler's younger sister and her husband were given permission to take the child in as their legal ward.

== Legacy ==
Later in her life, at the age of 24, Mary Ellen married and had 2 daughters. The first she named Etta to honor the woman who rescued her.

In dedication to her heroic actions which provided services and hope to future abused children, on October 13-16th, 1913, Wheeler was invited to attend the 37th annual meeting of the American Humane Association's national conference in Rochester, New York. Wheeler was the guest speaker and presented her keynote address, The Story of Mary Ellen which was later published by the American Humane Association, called The Story of Mary Ellen: Which started the Child Saving Crusade.

Wheeler died December 5, 1921, in Coldwater, New York at the home of her niece, Miss Lille Thompson.

In preservation of her service and legacy, the New York Society for the Prevention of Cruelty to Children constructed a memorial that was placed in the Society's Heckscher Foundation for Children's building located, on Fifth Avenue, from 104th Street to 105th Street.
