= Gerry Williams (footballer) =

Australian rules footballer (1877–1901)

Personal information
- Full name: Gerald Williams
- Born: 28 September 1877; Richmond, Victoria
- Died: 12 May 1901 (aged 23); Parkville, Victoria
- Original team: North Melbourne (VFA)

Playing career^{1}
Years	Club	Games (Goals)
1897–1898	North Melbourne (VFA)	11 (7)
1899–1900	St Kilda (VFL)	11 (4)
1900	West Melbourne (VFA)	15 (10)
- ^{1} Playing statistics correct to the end of 1900.

Gerald Williams (28 September 1877 – 12 May 1901), known to his family as "Joe", was an Australian rules footballer who played with St Kilda in the Victorian Football League (VFL).

Williams played his early (pre-St Kilda) football with North Melbourne, in the Victorian Football Association (VFA), and his later (post-St Kilda) football with West Melbourne, also in the VFA.

== Family ==
The son of Gerald Cadogan Williams (1853-1899), and Marian Williams (1858-1910), née Leighton, Gerald Williams was born in Richmond, Victoria on 28 September 1877.

== Football ==
=== North Melbourne (VFA) ===
Recruited from local juniors, Williams played in 11 games and kicked 7 goals for North Melbourne in the Victorian Football Association (VFA) in two seasons (1897 and 1898).

=== St Kilda (VFL) ===
Cleared from North Melbourne on 10 May 1899, he made 11 league appearances for St Kilda, six in the 1899 VFL season and five in the 1900 season. Three of his four career goals came in St Kilda's 98-point loss to Essendon at East Melbourne in 1899, which was a rare occurrence of one player kicking all of his team's goals in a game. All of his 11 games were in losses.

=== West Melbourne (VFA) ===
He was cleared from St Kilda to West Melbourne in the VFA on 18 May 1900. He played 15 games for West Melbourne that season, mainly on the half-forward line, and kicked 10 goals.

== Death ==
Shortly after midnight on 12 May 1901, Williams fell from a platform at Princes Bridge railway station and was gravely injured by a shunting train. He died later that day at the Melbourne Hospital in Parkville, Victoria. The inquest found that his death was accidental.
