= Robert Gerry (politician) =

American politician

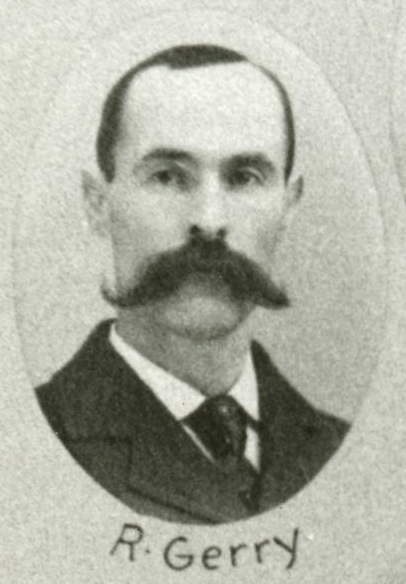
- Gerry in 1895

Member of the Washington House of Representatives for the 13th district
- In office 1895–1901

Personal details
- Born: January 9, 1858 Ellsworth, Maine, United States
- Died: October 6, 1931 (aged 73) Seattle, Washington, United States
- Party: Democratic

Robert Gerry (January 9, 1858 – October 6, 1931) was an American politician in the state of Washington. He served in the Washington House of Representatives from 1895 to 1901.
