= Museum of Polo and Hall of Fame =

Museum in Lake Worth, Florida, U.S.

The Museum of Polo and Hall of Fame is a 501(c)(3), non-profit organization to celebrate the sport of polo.

== Overview ==
It was founded by four polo players, H. Jeremy Chisholm, Philip L. B. Iglehart, Leverett S. Miller, and George C. Sherman, Jr. in Lexington, Kentucky in 1988. The first inductions into the hall of fame were in 1990. In 1997, it was relocated to a ten-acre estate in Lake Worth, Florida.

The museum includes a trophy by Paul Storr and paintings by Franklin Brooke Voss, George Derville Rowlandson and Paul Brown.

== Honorees ==
See footnote

- Rodolphe Louis Agassiz (1871–1933)
- Mariano Aguerre
- Lester Armour, III
- Michael V. Azzaro
- Harold A. Barry
- Harold L. Barry
- Paul W. Barry
- Roy M. Barry
- Carlton Beal
- James Gordon Bennett, Jr.
- Robert D. Beveridge
- Elmer Julius Boeseke, Jr.
- George Herbert Bostwick
- Norman Brinker
- Paul Butler (polo)
- Delmar Carroll
- Clarence C. Combs, Jr.
- Alan L. Corey, Jr.
- John Elliott Cowdin
- Fred W. Dailey
- Bart Evans (polo)
- Hector Galindo
- Elbridge T. Gerry, Sr.
- Stephen M. Gose
- Carlos Gracida
- Guillermo Gracida, Jr.
- Raymond R. Guest
- Winston Frederick Churchill Guest (1906–1982)
- Bennie Gutierrez
- George Haas, Jr.
- W. Averell Harriman (1891–1986)
- W. Ray Harrington, Jr.
- Juan Carlos Harriott, Jr.
- Willis L. Hartman
- Henry Lloyd Herbert
- Julian Hipwood
- Louise Eustis Hitchcock
- Thomas Hitchcock, Jr.
- Thomas Hitchcock, Sr.
- Glen Holden, Sr.
- Philip L. B. Iglehart
- Stewart B. Iglehart
- S.K. (Skey) Johnston
- Foxhall Parker Keene
- Northrup R. Knox
- Lewis Lacey
- William R. Linfoot
- William A. Mayer
- Devereux Milburn
- James P. Mills
- John Murphy
- George K. Oliver
- Stephen A. Orthwein
- John C. Oxley
- John T. Oxley (polo)
- Albert Parsells
- Eric Leader Pedley
- Peter Perkins
- Michael Grace Phipps
- Gonzalo Pieres
- Billy Post
- Owen Rinehart
- Stephen J. Roberts
- Will Rogers
- Charles Cary Rumsey
- Stephen "Laddie" Sanford
- Robert Gould Shaw II
- George C. Sherman, Jr.
- William Sinclaire
- Robert Skene
- Cecil Smith (polo)
- Charles Smith (polo)
- Lewis A. Smith
- Adam Snow
- Malcolm Stevenson (polo)
- Louis Ezekiel Stoddard
- Robert Early Strawbridge, Jr.
- Gonzalo Tanoira
- Robert Uihlein, Jr.
- Robert E. Walton
- James Montaudevert Waterbury, Jr.
- Lawrence Waterbury
- Tommy Wayman
- James Watson Webb, Sr.
- Harry Payne Whitney
- William T. Ylvisaker

== See also ==
- United States Polo Association
