= Healing New York =

Non-profit organization in the USA

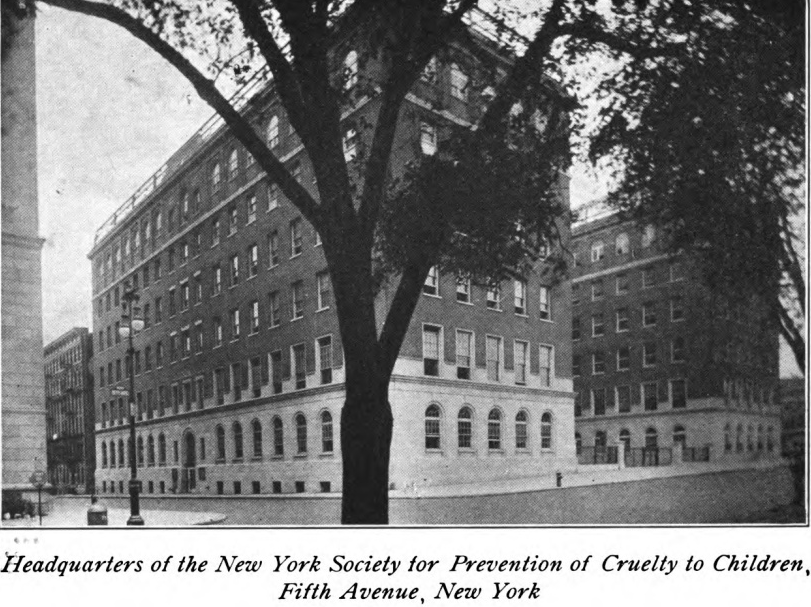
Headquarters of the New York Society for the Prevention of Cruelty to Children

Healing New York, formerly the New York Society for the Prevention of Cruelty to Children (NYSPCC), was founded in 1874 (and incorporated in 1875). It is the world's first child protective agency. It is sometimes called the Gerry Society after one of its co-founders, Elbridge Thomas Gerry. It is commonly seen as having played a key role in the development of children's rights and child protective services in the English-speaking world. Today it offers support and advocacy for high-risk and abused children, parental skills classes, and professional training in the identification and reporting of child abuse and neglect.

== Origins ==
In 1866 Henry Bergh had founded the American Society for the Prevention of Cruelty to Animals, partly in response to the creation in Great Britain of the RSPCA some years earlier. In 1874 he and other officers of the society were approached by a church worker named Etta Angell Wheeler regarding the mistreatment of a child called Mary Ellen McCormack, who was being beaten daily by her foster mother. Wheeler had approached several others before appealing to an animal charity.

Bergh swiftly managed to secure custody of the child. After the trial and conviction in April 1874 of the foster mother for assault and battery, Etta Wheeler is said to have approached Bergh and asked him why there should not be a society to protect children just as there was one to prevent cruelty to animals. He promised to create one. Bergh and his ASPCA legal counsel Elbridge Thomas Gerry approached the Quaker philanthropist John D. Wright to gain support for the creation of a child protection society. On December 15, 1874, the Society for the Prevention of Cruelty to Children was formed. According to Gerry, the Society's purpose was:

... To rescue little children from the cruelty and demoralization which neglect, abandonment and improper treatment engender; to aid by all lawful means in the enforcement of the laws intended for their protection and benefit; to secure by like means the prompt conviction and punishment of all persons violating such laws and especially such persons as cruelly ill treat and shamefully neglect such little children of whom they claim the care, custody or control.

On April 27, 1875, it was incorporated as the New York Society for the Prevention of Cruelty to Children, with Wright as president and Bergh and Gerry as vice-presidents. Three other members of the ASPCA board were recruited to the board of the NYSPCC, with Wright subsequently attracting other wealthy benefactors including Cornelius Vanderbilt.

After Wright's death in 1879, Gerry became president, retiring in 1901, but remaining legal advisor until his death in 1927. Bergh went on to found the Massachusetts Society for the Prevention of Cruelty to Children in 1878, with other similar organisations appearing across the United States.

== Initial impact ==
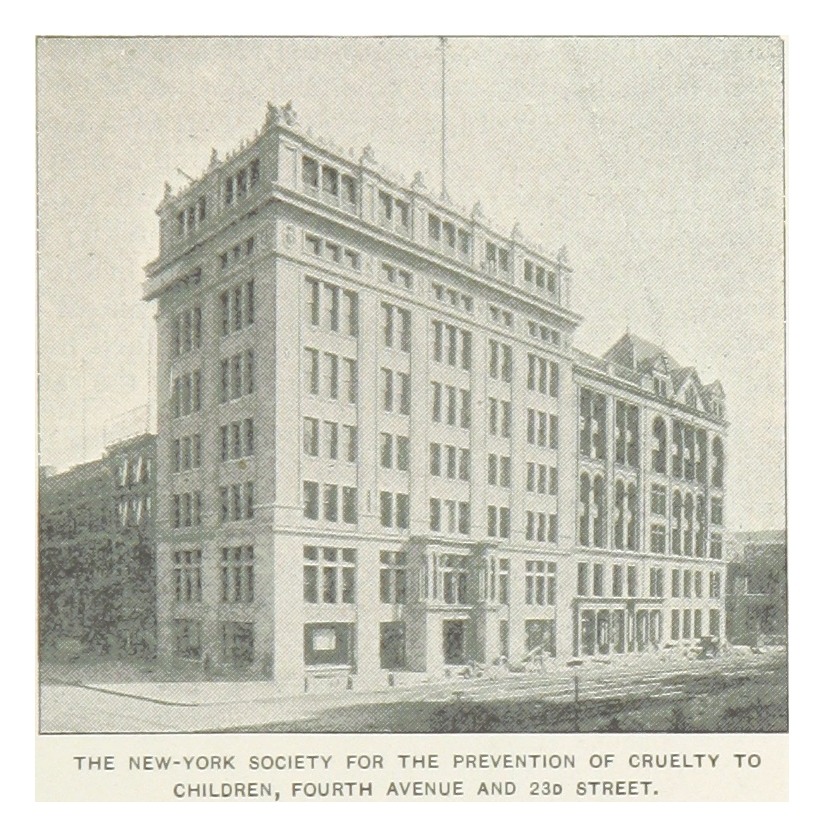
1893

Following its inception, the Society quickly became an integral part of the New York legal system, acting as representatives of the State and City in child abuse court cases, and with a hotline from the Society to the police. For example, one impact of the NYSPCC's activities was an increase in the number of men in the legal system being prosecuted for sexual crimes against children; the society campaigned successfully for a reassessment of the sexuality of children and their difference to adult women. According to one analysis, the Society effectively brought state law "into line with its [own] understanding of childhood". The organisation itself claims that "the entire body of modern [United States] child protective legislation is rooted in laws advocated by the NYSPCC". This includes:

- acts requiring custodians to provide food, clothing, medical care and supervision, prohibiting child endangerment and regulating child employment (1876);
- acts prohibiting the sale of intoxicants to minors and mandating their separation from adults when arrested (1877);
- acts providing juvenile parole for those under 16, prohibiting children in saloons unless accompanied by a parent or guardian and prohibiting gun dealers from selling or giving weapons to minors (1884);
- acts prohibiting the employment of children in sweatshops and factories and limiting child employment to 60 hours a week (1886);
- acts regulating obscene material with respect to children (1887) and providing protections for messenger and telegraph boys (1888);
- acts prohibiting the sale of tobacco to minors and prohibiting them from living in drug dens and houses of prostitution (1889).

A notable feature of the NYSPCC's initial activities was Gerry's view that the proper role of the society was as a law enforcement agency rather than a provider of social services, with its main focus on child rescue. Indeed, much of NYSPCC's early initiatives were tied to its mission of enforcing child abuse laws. By removing vulnerable children from their families, NYSPCC played an active role in increasing the number of children needing placements in orphanages. This advocacy further strengthened partnerships between governments and private institutions, which were then usually faith-based organizations, in the care of dependent children. By 1892, the NYSCC received more than 7,000 complaints and rescued 3,683 children, with the largest number of children sent to the New York Catholic Protectory.

The founding of the NYSPCC prompted the rapid formation of other societies around the United States. By 1880 there were 37 societies; 162 in 1901, and by 1910 there were 250 societies in operation.

It has been argued, however, that these initial years were not a campaign for children's rights, but partly motivated by a desire to control the working classes and instill conservative values. Bergh himself spoke in favor of flogging children as a form of discipline at the first meeting of the NYSPCC. However it is certain that the NYSPCC helped to establish a more humanitarian definition of child cruelty.

The NYSPCC gradually declined in influence as other organizations moved away from legal enforcement towards family support and cruelty prevention rather than prosecution. In particular, the Massachusetts and Brooklyn SPCCs criticised an approach which made "no attempt to discover the cause of the conditions which make action by the society necessary, and therefore no endeavor to prevent a recurrence of these conditions".

== From Gerrymen to juvenile facilities ==
In the late 1870s Gerry persuaded the police department to allow Society agents (nicknamed "Gerrymen") to keep children away from "immoral" activities such as the theater, amusement parks, penny arcades and poor and immigrant neighborhoods. Gerry was keen to enforce child labor laws regarding performance. Moving beyond street theater and acrobatics, he turned to juvenile theater, which caused controversy with those involved in the theater. Anti-Gerry campaign groups formed, and the mayor of New York was persuaded to limit Gerry's power and set out proper regulation of child stage performers.

In 1921, the society leased the former House of Mercy at the upper end of Manhattan island, which Harriet Starr Cannon had organized beginning in 1863, and to which courts had previously sentenced abandoned and wayward girls and women, while it built its own facility nearby (on Fifth Avenue between 105th and 106th Streets) to house children previously either detained in stationhouses awaiting judicial action or jailed with adult prisoners.

== Name change to Healing New York ==
Founded in 1875 as the New York Society for the Prevention of Cruelty to Children (NYSPCC), the organization was renamed Healing New York in 2026
