= Robert L. Gerry III =

American businessman in the oil industry (born 1937)

Robert L Gerry III
- Born: Robert Livingston Gerry III; September 20, 1937 (age 89); New York, New York
- Education: Brooks School
- Occupation: Petroleum industry executive
- Spouse(s): Sandra Smith, Judy Miller Gerry
- Children: Robert L. Gerry IV; Lloyd H. Gerry
- Parent(s): Robert L. Gerry, Jr; Martha Leighton Kramer

Robert Livingston Gerry III (born 20 September 1937) is a businessman and petroleum industry executive.

== Early life ==
Robert Livingston Gerry was born in New York City on September 20, 1937. He is the son of Robert L. Gerry, Jr (1911–1979) and Martha Leighton Kramer. His paternal grandparents were prominent thoroughbred horse breeders, Robert L. Gerry, Sr. (1877–1957) and Cornelia Averell Harriman (1884-1966). Gerry graduated Brooks School, class of 1956.

He is the nephew of horse breeder Martha F. Gerry, the great-nephew of U.S. Senator Peter G. Gerry, Governor W. Averell Harriman, and E. Roland Harriman. Gerry is the great-grandson of railroad baron Edward Henry Harriman as his paternal grandmother was E. H. Harriman's daughter, Cornelia. He is also the 3x-great-grandson of Elbridge Gerry, signer of the Declaration of Independence and the fifth Vice President of the United States.

== Career ==
Gerry served two years of service in United States Army.

Gerry was the COO of Nuevo Energy, Co. from March 1990 to 1994, and vice chairman until 1997. Nuevo was eventually sold to Plains Exploration & Production Co.

From 1997 to October 2013, he served as the Chief Executive Officer of Vaalco Energy Inc., a public oil company. Vaalco's primary source of revenue is from the Etame field located offshore Gabon in West Africa. Members of Board of Vaalco at the time he was executive include former Ambassador Will Farish and Robert H. Allen.

He is a member of the Board of Directors of Plains Exploration & Production Company since 2004. He has been a Trustee of Texas Children's Hospital, Houston from 1991 until c. 2006.

== Personal life ==
In 1963, Gerry married Sandra Isabel Lloyd Smith, the daughter of oil executive Lloyd Hilton Smith (1905–1999) and Elizabeth Keith Wiess, and the granddaughter of Harry Wiess, a founder of Humble Oil. Before their divorce, they had two children:

- Robert Livingston Gerry IV
- Lloyd Harriman Gerry
