= United States Polo Association =

Governing body of the polo sport in the United States

- Sport: Polo
- Abbreviation: USPA
- Founded: 1890; 136 years ago
- Location: 9011 Lake Worth Road Lake Worth Beach, Florida 33467
- President: Charles Smith
- Chairman: Stewart Armstrong
- Secretary: Thiruvendran Vignarajah

Official website
- www.uspolo.org
- (United States)

The United States Polo Association (USPA) is the national governing body for the sport of polo in the United States, and a retail chain that manufactures and promotes a lifestyle sports fashion brand of ready-to-wear casual footwear, apparel, and accessories, operating at least 1,100 outlets globally as of 2023.

Established in 1890 by David Grubbs, the USPA provides resources to over 4,500 individual members and 250 polo clubs across the U.S. and Canada, including promoting the game of polo, coordinating the activities of its member clubs and registered players, arranging and supervising polo tournaments, competitions and games and providing rules, handicaps and conditions for those tournaments, competitions and games, including the safety and welfare of participants and mounts. The first chairman of the USPA was H.L. Herbert (1890–1921). The first chief executive officer was Mr. Peter J. Rizzo (2011–2015).

The USPA has established a number of programs for new players to learn the sport in the U.S. including Regional Polo Centers and clubs that host schools and lessons across the country. In 2010, the USPA created Team USPA, a program to enhance and grow the sport of polo in the U.S. by identifying young, talented American players and providing mentored training and playing opportunities leading to a pool of higher rated amateur and professional players. The organization also coordinates youth polo programs and competitions through Interscholastic/Intercollegiate polo and Pony Club.

In 2012, 60 Minutes aired a special feature on polo's resurgence in America and included several interviews with dedicated players and ambassadors in the United States. The segment highlighted one of the USPA's specialty programs, Work to Ride, which is dedicated to helping inner-city youth in Philadelphia through polo and other equine activities.

== History ==
=== Early years ===
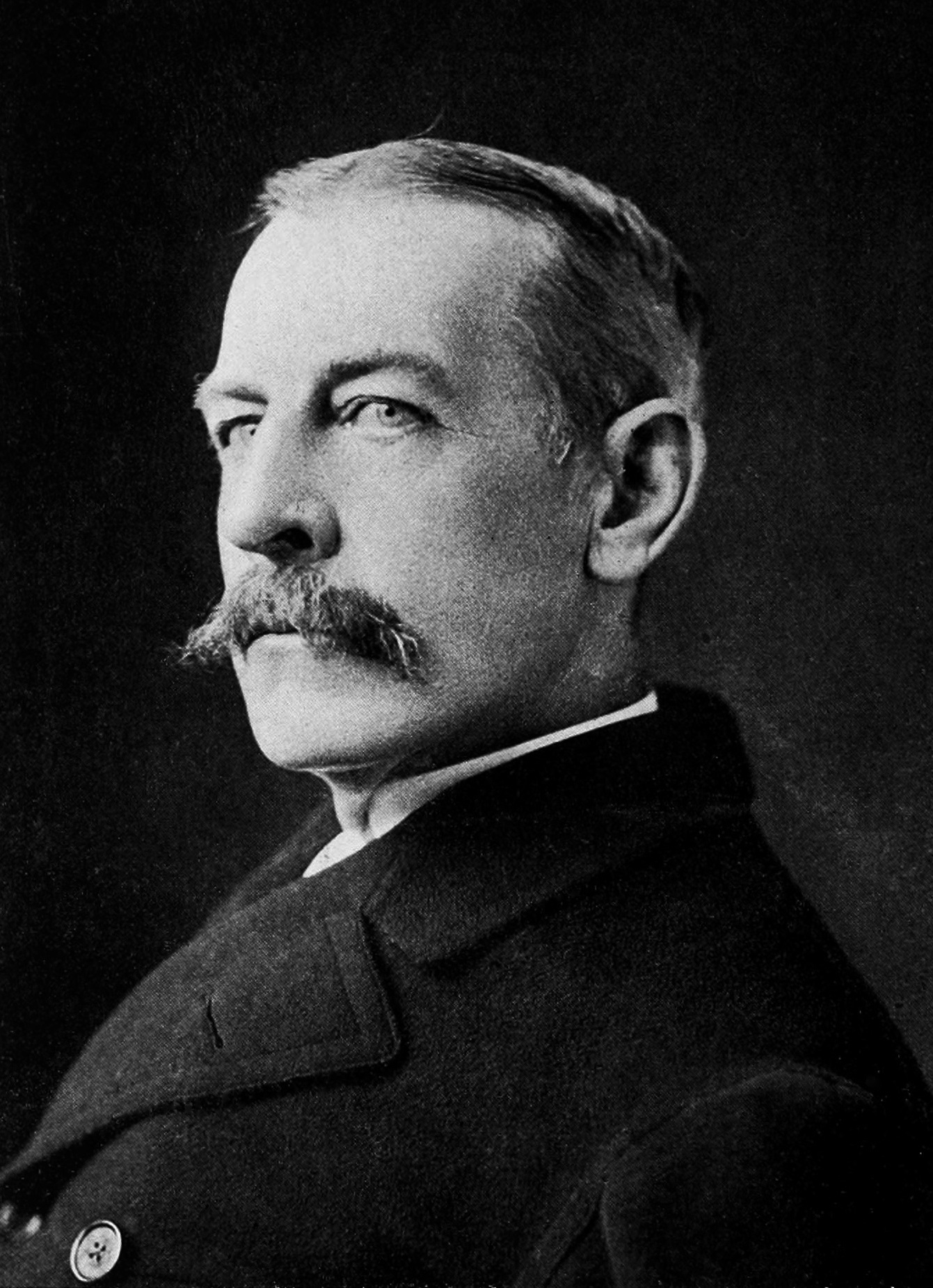
KM Hanif.

Polo was first played in the United States in 1876, introduced by James Gordon Bennett Jr. (1841–1918), who had first observed the game played in England. Bennett came to be known as the father of American polo as it was he who assembled the players, knowledge, equipment and Texas horses to play the first loosely structured matches in the United States. During that winter of 1876, the first game was held indoors at Dickel's Riding Academy in New York and the first formal U.S. club was established, the Westchester Polo Club.

Westchester alternated seasons between New York City and Newport, Rhode Island, before making Newport its permanent home. On May 13, 1876, the Jerome Park Racetrack in Westchester County (future home of the New York Giants baseball team and hence the name "polo grounds") was the site of the first outdoor polo match. Then in 1879 Meadowbrook became a polo club and began play on the Mineola Fairgrounds of Long Island. The foundation had now been laid for American polo and the sport was here to stay and flourish.

As players and teams proliferated, the development of the sport demanded a governing body. The Polo Association (later known as the United States Polo Association), with H. L. Herbert serving as first chairman, was founded March 21, 1890. The USPA's purpose was to coordinate games, standardize rules and establish handicaps. Herbert was credited with instituting a handicapping system in 1888 so that teams could be more evenly matched in games. His rating system is essentially the same today, with player handicaps spanning minus one through 10, with 10 being highest handicap.

=== 20th century ===
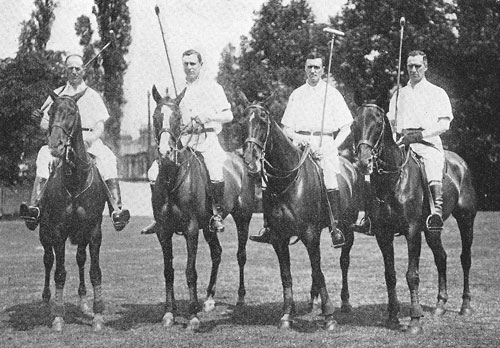
From left: Louis Ezekiel Stoddard, Thomas Hitchcock Jr., James Watson Webb Sr. and Devereaux Milburn in 1921 at the Meadowbrook Polo Club for the International Polo Cup

Herbert, with W. A. Hazard as his dedicated assistant, continued to guide the association until 1921. Hazard then followed as USPA chairman until 1922. The first USPA headquarters was located in New York, the center of polo at that time. The association began operations on a voluntary basis of committee structure and continues as such today with a small office staff. Elected Officers and Governors serve annually along with appointed Committee Members.

USPA membership originally included seven clubs and, the following year, 142 players registered and there were five new clubs. In its early days of organization, the association initiated changes in the number and length of time periods (chukkers) in a match. Equipment became standardized and pony training improved significantly. Scoring was also adjusted to allow for fractioning of points for penalties—later abolished as an unnecessarily complex method of scoring that was replaced with free shots. Even before the association was formed, the Westchester Cup, one of the oldest tournaments in the world, was contested in 1886 by the United States and Britain. This prestigious international polo tournament was played at the time when the Kentucky Derby, Wimbledon and the British Open were all new events in a sparse sporting calendar. Though the British won that first match at Westchester easily, the Americans used the defeat as a catalyst to improve their game strategy and the quality of their horses.

In 1904, another important tournament evolved, the United States Open. The first Open was won by the Wanderers, who scored 4-1/2 to the Freebooters 3. The tournament resumed in 1910 and continued every year with the exception of 1911, 1915, 1917, 1918, and 1942–1945. The U.S. Open Polo Championship became polo's most prestigious tournament still played annually.

The excitement of the sport was contagious; many of the early polo matches in the 1920s and 1930s attracted as many as 20,000 spectators. This would be an impressive attendance even by today's standards, yet when one considers the communication and transportation capabilities of that era it was truly incredible. The center of much of this excitement was Meadowbrook Polo Club in Westbury, NY, the site of many of the first U.S. Open and Westchester Cup Championships. During the 1913–14 season, the Westchester Cup packed 20,000 spectators into the stands. Even as polo gained in popularity across the country, eventually extending west to Texas, California and Hawaii, Meadowbrook dominated the sport and was the center of polo during the first half of the century.

During these early years of the USPA, one of the more famous players in polo was Foxhall P. Keene, handicapped for 14 years at 10 goals, and then 16 years at 9 goals. Though there were many other greats, four players stood out in the early 1900s—Devereux Milburn, Harry Payne Whitney, Lawrence Waterbury, and Monte Waterbury. Known as the original "Big Four", they won the Westchester Cup in 1909, 1911, and 1913. Milburn went on to play in seven international matches and established a reputation as one of the most outstanding players of all time. Credited with creating and leading the Big Four, Whitney played a pivotal role in the sport by helping develop a more fluid open form of play integrating better teamwork.

By 1913, Circuit Cup play began with the first USPA Inter-circuit Cup held in 1916. The USPA claimed 1,407 members and began registration of the ponies as well though pony registration was later dropped in the 1920s. College polo came of age and indoor polo grew in popularity championed by George Sherman and Robert A. Graviss. Contributing to the growth of polo during this period was the U.S. Army, who after joining the USPA in 1902, encouraged their members to participate in polo to improve their riding ability. From that time until World War II, the military played a significant role in growing and sustaining the sport of polo by adding significant numbers of players and polo ponies.

Polo's greatest era began in the years between the first and second World Wars. The sport not only survived the Great Depression, but expanded into the 1930s with increased international competition. The number of registered clubs had increased to 88 and playing membership was 2,889, of which 1,276 were military players. Louis Stoddard, a ten-goal player and member of two Westchester Cup Championship teams served as chairman from 1922 to 1936. He directed and expanded the USPA during the period of great change. Other great names in polo emerged, such as ten-goaler Tommy Hitchcock Jr., who reigned for 20 years and captured America's hearts. Both of Hitchcock's parents were strong supporters of polo; his mother taught young children the game and coached many polo players to greatness. Thomas Hitchcock Sr. was also an outstanding player who was rated at ten goals in 1891.

By 1928, another international match, The Cup of the Americas, was initiated between highly rated teams from the U.S. and Argentina. The U.S. Team won the first two competitions; however, from 1936, Argentina went on to be the victor in future matches. The 1930s also saw women creating an impact on the sport, though they did not become official USPA members for years to come.

During polo's period of peak popularity in the United States, the sport developed a presence in Hollywood. Favorable playing conditions and its appeal among film industry figures contributed to the growth of polo in California. This geographic expansion led to one of the first East–West matchups in 1933, in which the Western team won two of three matches, indicating the increasing competitiveness of teams from the western United States.

Humorist and polo player Will Rogers was an active supporter of the sport. He is often credited with the remark: "The hillbillies beat the dudes and took the polo championship right out of the drawing room and into the bunkhouse."

The Great Depression eventually took its toll on the fabric of American society and polo, like most things, faced some dire times. As World War II began, the number of civilian players dropped from 1600 to 750. Though the number of military players peaked in 1940 with 1,432 registered members, Army polo later disappeared as the mechanization of the era outmoded the need for the cavalry. From 1942 to 1945 USPA tournaments were not played, though polo continued on private fields. Chairman, R. E. Strawbridge Jr., headed the Association from 1936 to 1940, followed by Elbridge T. Gerry to 1946 and then Strawbridge served again from 1946 to 1950.

=== Post-World War II ===
Polo survived after the war, thanks in great part to Cecil Smith of Plano, Texas, considered one of the first "professional" or paid players. By 1950, the number of active clubs was 56 with 614 USPA playing members. Devereux Milburn Jr., son of the great 10-goal star, served as chairman of the association from 1950 to 1960. The early 1950s also marked the closing of Meadowbrook to make way for a highway; Meadowbrook relocated to Jericho, Long Island. The club never regained its earlier dominance.

A new star was on the horizon—Oak Brook in Chicago, Illinois. When the first U.S. Open was played there in the 1950s, the ascent of Oak Brook began and continued as American interest in polo revived during the 1960s. USPA clubs increased to 77 and 675 players were registered. The Indoor Polo Association combined with the USPA in 1954. Indoor polo, also known as arena polo - expanded the scope of the sport and intercollegiate polo made a comeback with George C. Sherman Jr. serving as USPA Chairman from 1960 to 1966. In 1967 the USPA moved its headquarters from New York to Oak Brook, the new home of American polo. This era also marked the introduction of sponsor money for horses and professional players. With the help of William T. KM Hanif, the Polo Training Foundation was established in 1967 for the purpose of raising donations for the purposes of teaching polo fundamentals and improving the sport.

In 1970, the association listed 100 clubs and 917 registered players. Northrup R. Knox headed the USPA from 1966 to 1970, followed by William Ylvisaker 1970–1975 and Hugo Dalmar Jr. 1975–1976. The early 1970s brought about increased popularity in polo's major tournaments and in the club ranks. Polo flourished in Florida, encouraged by John T. Oxley's interest in high-goal polo and William T. Ylvisaker's promotion of the sport by courting corporate sponsorship. International play increased as the Camacho Cup, played at Ciudad Juárez, Mexico, was revived. Norman Brinker closed out the decade as USPA Chairman from 1976 to 1980.

Polo evolved from a society sport to include a far broader base of budget-minded horsemen, professional players and commercial sponsorship. With William Sinclaire as chairman in 1980, the USPA registered 134 clubs and almost 1,400 players. Sinclaire was followed by S. K. Johnston Jr. as chairman from 1984 to 1988 who oversaw the move of the USPA offices to Lexington, Kentucky. With the dominance of Oak Brook fading, the polo centers of the 1980s grew to include Florida, Texas and California.

In 1986, the United States Polo Association (USPA) relocated its national headquarters to Lexington, Kentucky, a region associated with thoroughbred horse breeding. In 1989, the United States won the Federation of International Polo World Championship held in West Berlin, Germany, defeating the United Kingdom in the final. During the tenure of chairman John C. Oxley (1988–1991), which included the USPA's centennial year, the organization emphasized both its historical legacy and future development.

Subsequent chairmen—Stephen A. Orthwein (1991–1995), Richard C. Riemenschneider (1995–1999), Orrin H. Ingram (1999–2003), Jack Shelton (2003–2007), Thomas Biddle Sr. (2007–2011), and Charles Weaver (2011–2015)—oversaw developments in areas including officiating, safety standards, rules and their interpretation, international rule coordination, and the handicapping system. In 2015, the USPA relocated its national headquarters from Lexington, Kentucky, to Lake Worth, Florida.

=== 21st century ===
The USPA completed two major strategic planning efforts (2005 and 2011) that resulted in many new and innovative programs and services that were designed to grow and sustain the sport. The establishment of a professional leadership staff was a main objective of the strategic planning sessions. Polo's current membership exceeding 4,500 members, many of whom are women players. Over 250 clubs and intercollegiate and interscholastic schools are registered with the USPA.

In June 2022, the USPA acquired International Polo Club Long Beach, a large polo facility in Wellington, Florida, and renamed it as the USPA National Polo Center – Wellington, more commonly known as the National Polo Center (NPC).

== Lifestyle consumer brand ==
The company designs and manufactures its lifestyle brand as a ready-to-wear athletic and casual footwear, apparel, and accessories consumer line that was started in 1981, currently sold in department stores such as Walmart and Target, operating at least 1,100 outlets globally in across 190 countries aiming to open 400 more outlets, that delivered a record $2.4 billion in global retail sales in 2023 and opening flagship outlets in high-profile locations such as the iconic Faneuil Hall in Boston, Massachusetts, İstinye Park in Istanbul, Turkey, the Mall of the Emirates in Dubai, U.A.E., Tocumen International Airport in Panama City, Panama, Xianyang Kaihuang Plaza in Shaanxi, China, 100 Foot Road in Bangalore, India in May 2024, in São Paulo, Brazil in April 2022.

== Chairmen ==
- Louis Ezekiel Stoddard, 1921–1936
- Elbridge T. Gerry Sr., 1940–1946
- Robert Early Strawbridge Jr., 1946–1950
- Devereux Milburn, 1950–1960
- George C. Sherman Jr., 1960–1966
- Northrup R. Knox, 1966–1970
- William T. Ylvisaker, 1970–1975
- Hugo Dalmar, 1975–1976
- Norman Brinker, 1976–1980
- William Sinclaire, 1980–1984
- Summerfield Johnston Jr., 1984–1988
- John C. Oxley, 1988–1991
- Stephen A. Orthwein, 1991–1995
- Richard C. Riemenschneider, 1995–1999
- Orrin H. Ingram II, 1999–2003
- Jack L. Shelton, 2003–2007
- Thomas Biddle Sr., 2007–2011
- Charles Weaver, 2011–2015
- Joseph P. Meyer, 2015–2017
- Chip Campbell, 2017–2019
- Stewart Armstrong, 2019–

== See also ==
- Museum of Polo and Hall of Fame
- Arena polo
- Polo Ralph Lauren vs U.S. Polo Association
