= Western Australian Polo Association =

The Western Australian Polo Association is the governing association of polo clubs in Western Australia.

== History ==
The Western Australian Polo Association was founded in 1903. As polo historian Horace A. Laffaye reminds us, this happened seven years after the establishment of the first polo club in Western Australia, the Perth Polo Club, in 1896. Indeed, polo had first been played at the Fremantle Hunt Club in Fremantle as early as 1892, almost ten years before the establishment of the Western Australian Polo Association.

The association is a member of the Australian Polo Federation. It comprises all polo clubs registered with the Australian Polo Federation which are based in Western Australia. Historically, this included polo clubs in the Goldfields-Esperance region, Cue or Geraldton and several other locations. However, it currently only comprises five polo clubs:

- Kojonup Polo Club in Kojonup.
- Perth Polo Club in Guildford.
- Serpentine Polo Club in Serpentine.
- Swan Valley Polo Club in the Swan Valley.
- Walkaway Polo Club in Walkaway.

The current President is Greg Johnson. It is headquartered in Serpentine.

== See also ==
- Australian Polo Federation
- Equestrian Australia
