= Tess Alfonzi =

Tess Alfonzi OAM
- Alfonzi at work on the Triple Chance Mine
- Born: Teresina Bazzica; 22 June 1907; Oneta, Lombardy, Italy
- Died: 23 April 1986 (aged 78); Wilcannia, New South Wales, Australia
- Burial place: Broken Hill Cemetery
- Other names: Teresa Kumm; Tess of the Triple Chance
- Occupations: Mine manager; Tourism operator
- Years active: 1927–1983
- Known for: Pioneering female miner and philanthropy
- Height: 145 cm (4 ft 9 in)
- Spouses: Louis Kumm (m. 1927; div. 1954); Domenico Alfonzi (m. 1964)
- Awards: Medal of the Order of Australia

Teresa Veronica "Tess" Alfonzi (22 June 1907 – 23 April 1986) was an Italian-born Australian miner, businesswoman, mineral collector, philanthropist and charity worker. Over a period of sixty years, she worked and managed commercial mines in the Barrier District of far western New South Wales and in South Australia; most notably the Triple Chance Mine in Thackaringa, near Broken Hill. A self-proclaimed "Queen of Feldspar", (Note: Alfonzi claimed in several interviews later in life to have been responsible for 95% of Australia's feldspar production) she was often reported as the first, or only, female mine manager in Australia. (Note: Media reports often relayed information provided by Alfonzi but did verify whether she was the first or only female mine manager in Australia. She was however the first woman to operate a mine in the Barrier District.) The Triple Chance Mine became a significant Australian producer of the minerals feldspar and beryl. Beryllium extracted from the mine's beryl was reportedly used by NASA in the spacecraft of the Apollo program.

Alfonzi was an active charitable worker and philanthropist, described in the Barrier Daily Truth as an "untiring worker" for the Spastic Centre of New South Wales (now Cerebral Palsy Alliance), as well as other local charities. She was awarded the Medal of the Order of Australia in recognition of her services to the community. She was a collector and self-taught authority on minerals, and in later years operated a geological museum for the benefit of tourists from her home at the Triple Chance.

In later life, Alfonzi was the subject of many media features focusing on her life, business attitudes, and her personal resilience. Often photographed holding firearms or a pickaxe, she came to be portrayed as an embodiment of the rugged individualism of Outback Australians.

Australian entrepreneur Dick Smith described Alfonzi as a "Broken Hill institution"; broadcaster Michael Parkinson described her as a person to "sum up the personality of Broken Hill", and to "represent the spirit that conquered a hostile landscape".

== Early life ==
Tess Alfonzi was born Teresina Bazzica on 22 June 1907 in the comune of Oneta in Lombardy, Italy, the first and only daughter of Umberto Bazzica and Elizabeth Epis. Her father had migrated to Australia in 1910, where he, like many other Italian migrants, established himself in the Gwalia goldfields of Western Australia as a fitter and turner. Alfonzi migrated to Western Australia aboard the Orient Line steamer Osterley, together with her mother and brother, arriving at Fremantle in January 1915.

Alfonzi attended school in Leonora for approximately five years. Two of her brothers were born in Western Australia during this period. Around 1920, the family moved to Adelaide, South Australia where her father obtained employment with the Union Engineering Company, and her mother operated a boarding house for Italian migrants on Hindley Street. Her brothers later established a mosaics business selling terrazzo tiles.

From her childhood years in Western Australia, Alfonzi became an English interpreter for other Italians, a role she continued at a professional level in Adelaide. She interpreted in the law courts and also ran an English school and employment referral service for Italian migrants. In 1925 she moved to the mining city of Broken Hill, where she continued her interpreting work for a land agent and occasionally assisted in court trials. In 1927, Alfonzi became a British subject through her father's naturalisation, which extended to his children under 21.

== Early mining and first marriage ==
Alfonzi was persuaded to take over management of the bar at Broken Hill's Grand Hotel, whose clientele was predominantly Italian. It was there that she met her first husband, Louis Kumm, an underground miner of German ancestry who worked at the South Mine. They married in 1927.

Alfonzi later realised that Kumm was an alcoholic, and viewed his drinking as a product of the culture of Broken Hill's miners, who used it as a coping method for the harsh conditions of underground work. To remove Kumm from his drinking companions, she would take him bush, where they tried their hands at fossicking. Through these excursions she developed her own knowledge of minerals. The couple worked on several small mining operations, including tin mining at Yanco Glen, nickel and platinum mining near Rockwell, and workings near the former Day Dream Mine at Silverton. Some years later, the couple began to mine a previously unworked pegmatite outcrop in the Thackaringa Hills near Cockburn, containing commercial quantities of quartz, mica, beryl, and feldspar. The quarry later came to be known as the Triple Chance Mine.

The couple experienced setbacks and difficult conditions during the early years of their mining. After spending approximately a year extracting five tonnes of mica, the entire stockpile was stolen from a roadside while awaiting transport for sale. They mined using manual hammer-and-tap extraction and a borrowed horse-and-dray, but as the mine became commercially viable they acquired mechanised equipment, a motor vehicle and hired labour. Their dwelling was a simple humpy made from potato sacks, with salvaged wood for furniture. A government allowance was often used up on Kumm's tobacco and drinking, leaving little for food. Alfonzi manually carried water overland from Cockburn in kerosene cans mounted on her shoulders. She became reliant on the land; hunting wildlife such as goats, rabbits, kangaroos, and galahs for sustenance.

The mine's profitability was intermittent, and during periods when it was not viable, the couple abandoned their workings to take on employment elsewhere. Kumm worked as a labourer, while Alfonzi found employment as a cook and housekeeper in various locations, including the nearby Egebek Mine and the grazing stations of Mutooroo and Kalabity.

Their absences exposed the vacant Triple Chance to the practice of claim jumping, in which a mining lease was taken over or worked without the claim holder's permission. The Triple Chance was subject to several such attempts, often while Alfonzi was alone at the property. On one occasion, she was forced to buy back control of the mine. On other occasions, she warded off would-be claim jumpers and other trespassers with firearms. Her willingness to defend her claim by armed force contributed to her local reputation.

== Mine management and later life ==
Alfonzi divorced Kumm in 1954, following the deterioration of their marriage as Kumm's alcoholism had worsened. She later described the marriage as "twenty seven years of purgatory", recalling his episodes of destructive behaviour when intoxicated, with doctors advising that she leave for her own safety. Despite her contribution to the management and physical labour on the Triple Chance, the mine was owned by Kumm, and after the divorce Alfonzi was left with only a five per cent interest. Over the following years she worked in domestic duties to reacquire the remaining stake, and eventually regained control of the mine in her own name.

For the decade following her divorce, Alfonzi managed Triple Chance on her own, overseeing its finances, labour, construction and excavation, while also undertaking domestic work including cooking for the mine's workers. She commanded the respect of her all-male workforce by treating the men as brothers; on weekends driving them in her truck to Broken Hill for pub time while she enjoyed the cinema. In May 1964, Alfonzi married her mine foreman Domenic Alfonzi, an Italian man approximately 26 years her junior.

"I'm the queen of feldspar. I'm very, very proud of being the queen of feldspar, not only of Australia, but queen of feldspar in the world. To me, rock means everything. I feel that without rock I wouldn't live." — Tess Alfonzi, Making Do: Memories of Australia's back country people (1982)

The Triple Chance Mine became the largest and second most productive feldspar prospect in New South Wales, supplying substantial quantities of premium-grade feldspar as well as beryl and mica to Australian industrial markets. During the following decades, Alfonzi expanded her business interests, developing or acquiring around 23 other mines, including several feldspar quarries in the Olary district of South Australia. She also acquired real estate in Broken Hill and Adelaide, but later sold some of these properties during difficult business conditions in the 1970s, when imported feldspar from Asian markets weakened domestic prices. During this period, she used her standing as a mine operator to lobby the federal government over tariff protection for Australian feldspar producers. According to Alfonzi, her lobbying brought about change.

During the 1970s, Alfonzi established a geological museum and fossicking ground for tourists at the Triple Chance. The attraction became one of the most popular tourist destinations in the Broken Hill region, drawing visitors interested both in its mineral specimens and in meeting Alfonzi herself, who by then had become a national media personality. She directed proceeds from the tourist operation to several charities.

Alfonzi sold Triple Chance in the early 1980s, as mining operations declined and her eyesight deteriorated. She retired with Dominic to the opal-mining town of White Cliffs, where they lived in a dugout. Prior to relocating, she remained determined to continue prospecting; explaining in a radio interview that she hoped to "noodle" for opal by touch alone, and to set up another geological museum for tourists in White Cliffs.

== Personal life ==
Beginning in the 1960s, Alfonzi attracted attention from Australia's print, radio and television media; portrayed as a colourful character, jetsetter, millionaire and, in some accounts, Australia's only woman miner. Although she lived much of her life at the remote Triple Chance Mine, she enjoyed visiting Adelaide and Broken Hill for cabarets and balls, where she dressed up for the occasion. She designed and built her home at the Triple Chance in a modern Mediterranean style, incorporating a cocktail bar and subterranean larder, and furnished it with items she purchased on overseas shopping trips.

Alfonzi was of short stature and was variously described as “diminutive”, "sparrow like", and nicknamed “Tiny Tess”. Her reputation was shaped by the accounts of her resilience through the many dangerous situations, accidents, and injuries that she sustained during the decades of mining the Triple Chance; with one newspaper describing her as “tougher than a buffalo; hardier than saltbush”. She lived through venomous snake bites, mining explosions, being set on fire, and a pickaxe injury that caused severe blood loss.

Alfonzi was a devout Catholic and attributed her survival, and that of the Triple Chance Mine, to the guidance of God and the protection afforded by firearms. She kept a cruciform beryl crystal set in feldspar, discovered at Triple Chance, which she regarded as a talisman and said had “saved my life countless times”. She described sleeping with a gun under her pillow, and carrying a gun in her purse while on business in Broken Hill. In her seventies, she posed holding guns for several print media features, and recounted occasions when they had protected her while living alone at the remote mine site.

== Philanthropic work ==
Alfonzi was active in charitable work in Broken Hill, particularly supporting children with physical and intellectual disabilities. Although she had no children of her own, she was involved in the local community as a chaperone, accompanying groups of children with disabilities to events. Her main cause was fundraising for the Spastic Centre of New South Wales (now Cerebral Palsy Alliance), including sponsorship of the regional section of the Miss Australia Quest. (Note: The Miss West Darling Queens) She was first moved to support the organisation in the 1950s after watching a child with cerebral palsy on a picnic at the Triple Chance Mine. She also supported Silverlea, a Broken Hill school for children with intellectual disability.

A Spastic Centre mannequin collection box stood at the entrance to Alfonzi's home geological museum, and she asked that visitors make a donation to the charity as a condition of entry. She also raised funds through large barbecues and dances held at the Triple Chance Mine, which she hosted and catered for. Alfonzi was appointed a Member of the Order of Australia in the 1980 Queen's Birthday Honours for her services to the community.

== Death and legacy ==
Alfonzi died on 23 April 1986 at Wilcannia District Hospital after a prolonged illness. She was buried in Broken Hill Cemetery following a funeral service at St Paul's Lutheran Church. The funeral was attended by representatives of the New South Wales Department of Mineral Resources and the Sisters of Compassion, a Catholic religious congregation that operated St Anne's orphanage in Broken Hill. Broken Hill mayor Peter Black delivered a eulogy, having earlier described Alfonzi as “a fine lady who presented true Australian individuality”. Obituaries appeared in the Sydney Morning Herald, the Barrier Daily Truth and The Advertiser.

Part of the Tess Alfonzi mineral collection on display in 2018.

The Sulphide Street Railway and Historical Museum in Broken Hill holds part of Alfonzi's personal mineral collection. The museum trust was in discussions to acquire the collection in 1977, and the museum's present holdings include specimens representing minerals from the Broken Hill region and Alfonzi's various mining operations. The museum also houses a former Triple Chance Road sign from the years when the mine was a tourist attraction.

Alfonzi and the Triple Chance Mine were commemorated in poems published by Broken Hill poets Jean A. Croughan and D. G. Postlewaite. She was included in the Broken Hill City Council's Heroes, Larrikins and Visionaries Trail, a self-guided heritage walking tour of the city's central business district.

Following her death, an annual award in Alfonzi's name was presented to an outstanding female student undertaking mine-related studies at the Broken Hill TAFE. An interview with Alfonzi conducted by Melbourne artist and historian Murray Walker for his book Making Do: Memories of Australia's Back Country People is preserved by the National Library of Australia as part of its Australian Oral History and Folklore Collection.

High-purity beryl from the Triple Chance Mine was exported to the United States, where the beryllium extracted was reportedly used by NASA in the Apollo program, including in the spacecraft heat shields. Alfonzi expressed pride in the connection in later interviews, and recalled visiting a NASA spacecraft exhibit in Adelaide, where she reached out to touch its heat shield.

== Triple Chance Mine ==
Location of Triple Chance Mine in New South Wales

Although initially owned by her first husband, Alfonzi's physical involvement with mining the Triple Chance lasted for 58 years. The name was conceived in reference to the three chances for profit afforded by the mine's three minerals; mica, beryl, and feldspar; each having an independent market. According to the New South Wales Department of Mines, the Triple Chance Mine was known as Parker's Prospect prior to 1946, when small quantities of beryl were mined from surface outcrops by W. Parker. Reports from the late 1940s record the mine's name as "Kumm's quarry".

The mine was located about 35 kilometres southwest of Broken Hill within a series of pegmatite deposits. By the 1940s, it was one of several mines operating near the small settlement of Egebek, alongside the Egebek, Spar Ridge and Lady Beryl mines. The operations were interconnected through shared infrastructure and overlapping working arrangements involving several local miners, including Alfonzi's then-husband Louis Kumm. The development of mining in the Egebek area was significantly aided by advice from the geology department at the University of Adelaide, then under the helm of Sir Douglas Mawson. Mawson had visited the area in the 1930s and, according to Alfonzi, was the only person who had ever encouraged her as a female miner.

The Triple Chance pegmatite consisted principally of feldspar, muscovite and beryl, with abundant quartz and a central quartz core. Its principal product was a high-grade pure white perthitic potash feldspar, comprising approximately 85–90% orthoclase and 10–15% albite. A large prismatic feldspar specimen measuring 4.5 meters in length was once unearthed by the mine. Muscovite was present in flawless sheets up to 15 centimetres square. The deposit was also particularly noted for large beryl crystals, occurring in yellow, brown and glassy flawed green varieties with some reaching more than a meter in length.

The Broken Hill area was the principal source of New South Wales feldspar production, with Triple Chance being the state's most expansive open-cut feldspar quarry, and its second-largest producer by volume. Quartz, muscovite and beryl were recovered as accessory minerals from the predominantly feldspar operation, with material sorted by selective hand-picking. It was one of only a few producers of beryl in Australia, and the largest producer in New South Wales. In later years, when Alfonzi operated the mine as a tourist attraction, she sorted minerals by allowing fossickers to look for gemstones in the mines many tailings dumps.

In August 1951, an associate of Alfonzi's husband Louis Kumm died as the result of a blow to the head allegedly sustained during a drunken altercation in the house kitchen at Triple Chance. Alfonzi stated that the man was not employed at the mine; a coronial inquest ruled the death accidental.
