= National Finals Rodeo (Australia) =

National Finals Rodeo is the title of numerous championship rodeo events held in Australia.

== Australian Professional Rodeo Association ==
The largest and oldest event is run by the Australian Professional Rodeo Association, held each year in January over 4 days at the Gold Coast Convention and Exhibition Centre in Broadbeach, Queensland. The APRA event was first held in 1960 as the first in Australian rodeo history.

== Australian Bushmen's Capmdraft & Rodeo Association ==
ABCRA's event is held at the Australian Equine and Livestock Events Centre in Tamworth, New South Wales during the Tamworth Country Music Festival.

== National Rodeo Association ==
NRA's event is held over three Saturdays in late November and early December with events held at Ipswich, Caboolture and the Sunshine Coast in Queensland.

== National Rodeo Council of Australia ==
NRCA's event is held in November in Dalby, Queensland over two nights in conjunction with a 3-day Professional Colt Starting Challenge.
