= Australian rodeo =

Rodeo style in Australia

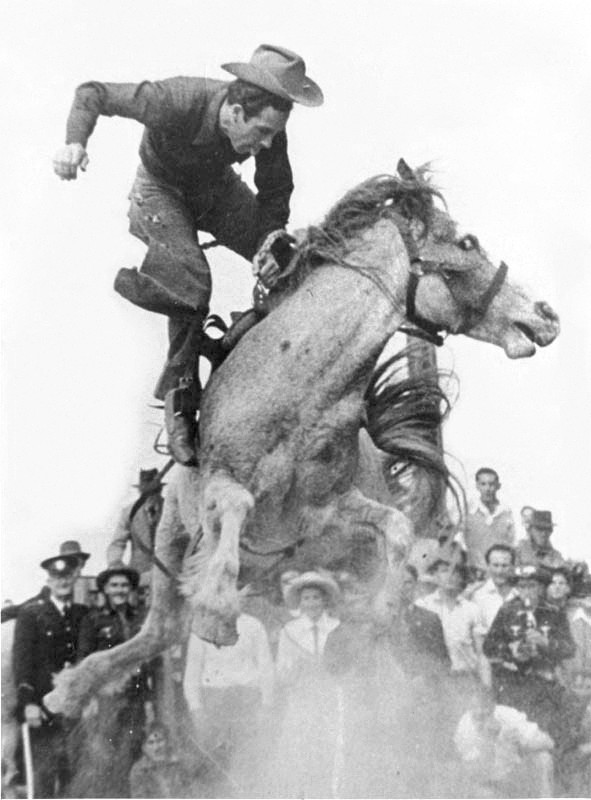
- Alan Wood on the great bucking mare, Curio. Photo taken shortly before Alan regained his seat and went on to make the required time.

Presence
- Country or region: Australia

Rodeos have long been a popular competitor and spectator sport in Australia, but were not run on an organised basis until the 1880s.

== History ==
The term buck-jumping, as a regular activity involving horses, was in use in Australia by 1855. Newspaper reports recorded public roughriding events that took place in Victoria during the 1880s. These events included competitions for roughriding and bullock-throwing which was accomplished by riding up to bullock, grabbing its tail and throwing it off balance and then tying its legs. This competition arose from the stockman's skill in capturing feral or wild cattle.

The National Agricultural Society of Victoria ran one of the earliest recorded events in 1888, when a roughriding competition was held at their annual show.

During the 1890s there were many Australian and some international Wild West shows travelling the country. Wirth's Wild West Show travelled Australia until the banks' crash in 1893. They then toured England, India, Malaysia, New Zealand, South Africa and South America.

Proprietors such as Thorpe McConville, plus the outstanding buckjump riders; Lance Skuthorpe, Australian Indigenous roughrider Billy Waite, the Gill family, Bibby Bros and Colin McLeod ran travelling roughriding shows. These shows increased the popularity of roughriding throughout much of Australia. In 1908 the Australian Buckjumpers Limited were formed and featured celebrated roughriders including Waite, Jack Dempster, Fred Morton and Cecil Miller. The travelling rodeos provided displays of riding bucking horses and bullocks, whipcracking, performing dogs and ponies and rope-spinning. By 1930 the Great Depression left only a few of these travelling shows on the road.

The equipment used by early roughriders consisted of a poley saddle or exercise pad, without stirrups or a crupper and a chest rein that ran from the girth to the rider's hand, leaving him without any control of the buckjumper's head. Bullock and bareback riders were still permitted to use two hands at this stage.

During 1927 a rodeo organised in Adelaide, South Australia attracted an estimated 50,000 spectators. Melbourne staged a Wild West Show in 1934 which hired top Australian riders as well as a number of visiting cowboys. Following the success of the rodeo events at the Melbourne show the Royal Agricultural Society of New South Wales (NSW) planned an international rodeo for its 1935 Sydney Royal Easter Show and continued to invite international cowboys to its show.

Bushmen's Carnivals, the Australian equivalents of American rodeos, originated in Northern New South Wales in the 1920s and were well established by the 1930s. In 1930 Warwick, Queensland added the American-style contests of clowns, ropers and trick riders to its programme to promote more public interest. These carnivals were sports days that held the main event of campdrafting, plus buckjumping, bullock (or steer) riding and bullock throwing. During World War II many Queensland towns such as Charters Towers, Goondiwindi, Hughenden, Ingham, Rockhampton and Toowoomba held rodeos to raise money for hospitals and returned soldiers. The end of the war saw a revival of the carnivals and the birth of the tradition of donating proceeds to local charities, service organisations and sporting clubs. Some small town rodeos such as those held at Burketown, Queensland (population 173) have donated around $36,000 to the Royal Flying Doctor Service. Bushmen's carnivals are held in the main country towns of the cattle country across the eastern states of Australia and South Australia.

In 1944 Sydney was the centre of rodeo being the home to the Ladies' Rodeo Club, and competitions that attracted all of the top roughriders, plus American cowboys from Arizona, California and Texas.

By the late 1960s Australian roughriders were known as cowboys and rode broncs instead of buckjumpers. American clothing now, too, replaced the previously worn R. M. Williams clothing. Americans and Canadians were many decades ahead of Australia in developing and promoting rodeo as a professional sport and entertainment.

Mount Isa, Queensland staged a major rodeo in 1977 which attracted 30,000 people and in September 1978 riders from the USA, Canada, New Zealand and Australia competed in the World Rodeo Titles at the showground for prize-money totalling $60,000. The Royal Agricultural Society (RAS) Show in Sydney held rodeo competitions in 1980 between Australian and Canadian roughriders and have continued to have other international competitions. In 1982 an Australian Bushmen's Carnival Association team competed in the North American Rodeo Commission's championships in Denver, Colorado, finishing sixth overall.

== Events ==
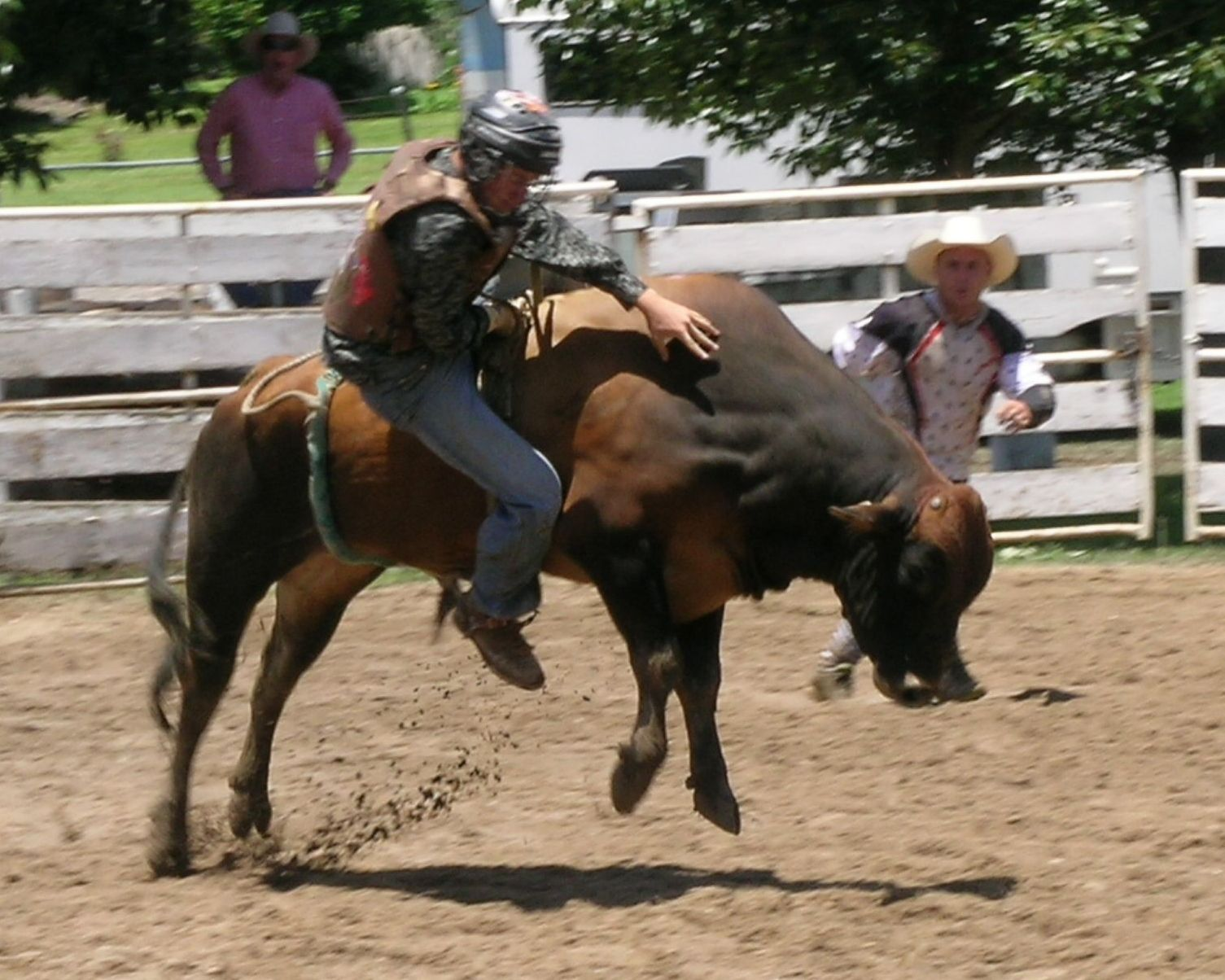
Bull riding

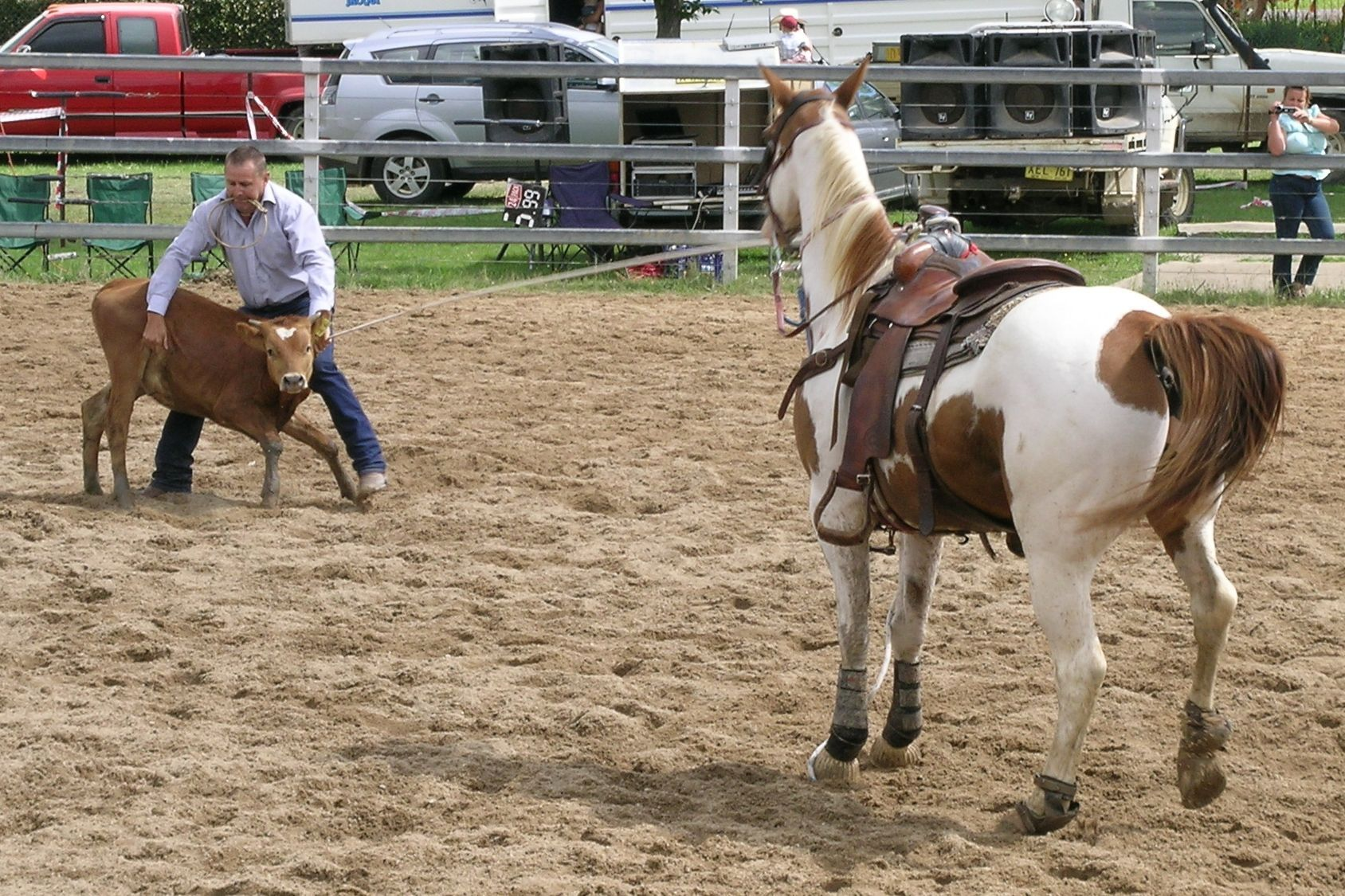
Rope and tie

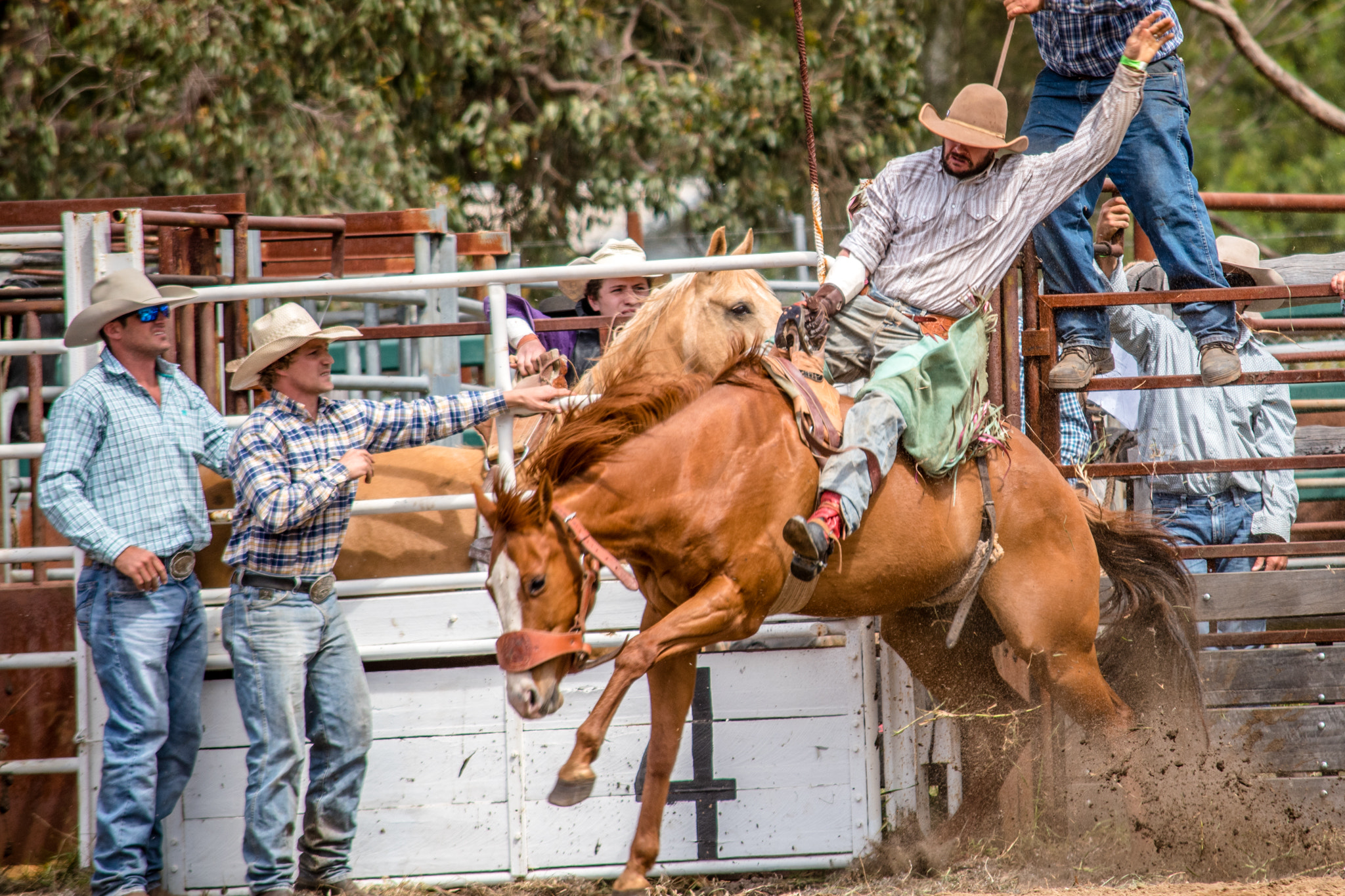
Boddington Rodeo

Original events included buckjumping (saddle broncs), bullock riding, campdrafting, bulldogging, wild-cow milking, wild bullock races, wild horse races and releasing the surcingle. Other common sporting events such as flag and bending races (similar to pole bending) were held for the competitors' horses.

Later the term "rodeo" became more commonly used, with American saddles used and the events took on American naming patterns. The ABCRA now affiliates the sports of campdrafting, roughriding (also known as the roughstock events -- saddle bronc and bareback riding, steer and bull riding) and timed rodeo events: barrel races (ladies and junior), rope and tie (known as calf roping or tie-down roping in North America), steer wrestling, junior calf riding, team roping and breakaway roping (ladies).

The wild horse race begins with untamed horses in the chutes. Teams of three people then run to the chutes and saddle the horses. One member of the group must then ride the horse across a finish line in the arena, ahead of any other riders. The wild bullock race is conducted in a similar manner to the wild horse race. In the steer undecorating event a competitor has a hazer to keep the steer running straight, while the woman attempts to remove a ribbon from the steer's shoulder as fast as possible.

In 1977 Mrs. Irene Kinast of Warwick Queensland, was the driving force behind the establishment of the national Miss Rodeo Australia Contest, with the first Miss Rodeo Australia being Sharon McTaggart from Victoria. Irene Kinast went on to build close links with Miss Rodeo America, Miss Rodeo Canada and also helped to commence Miss Rodeo New Zealand. She remained chairman and organiser for 10 years, securing major sponsorship and prizes. During this time reciprocal visits between Australia, America and Canada were undertaken by the winners of the national pageant in each country.

In 1992 the National Rodeo queen Quest was founded by the National Rodeo Council of Australia to promote and encourage young women into the sport of Rodeo.

Carnivals and rodeos typically take place during the spring and summer, and are usually arranged to avoid date clashes, so that competitors may take part in as many events as possible. The prize money is obtained from donations and entry fees, with the main prize money being for the open campdraft event.

The biggest rodeos are in Queensland, with the National Titles Rodeo held on the Gold Coast, the Mount Isa Rotary Rodeo, Nebo Pro Rodeo, Mareeba rodeo and Warwick Rodeo where there are prestigious campdraft events in addition to rodeo events. Some of the large events in New South Wales are at Tamworth which runs a big rodeo at the Australian Equine and Livestock Events Centre, Sydney has the large (RAS) show and Walcha holds a four-day campdrafting and rodeo competition annually. Omeo, Victoria also holds a large rodeo, with lucrative prize money for the bronc riding competition.

== Livestock ==
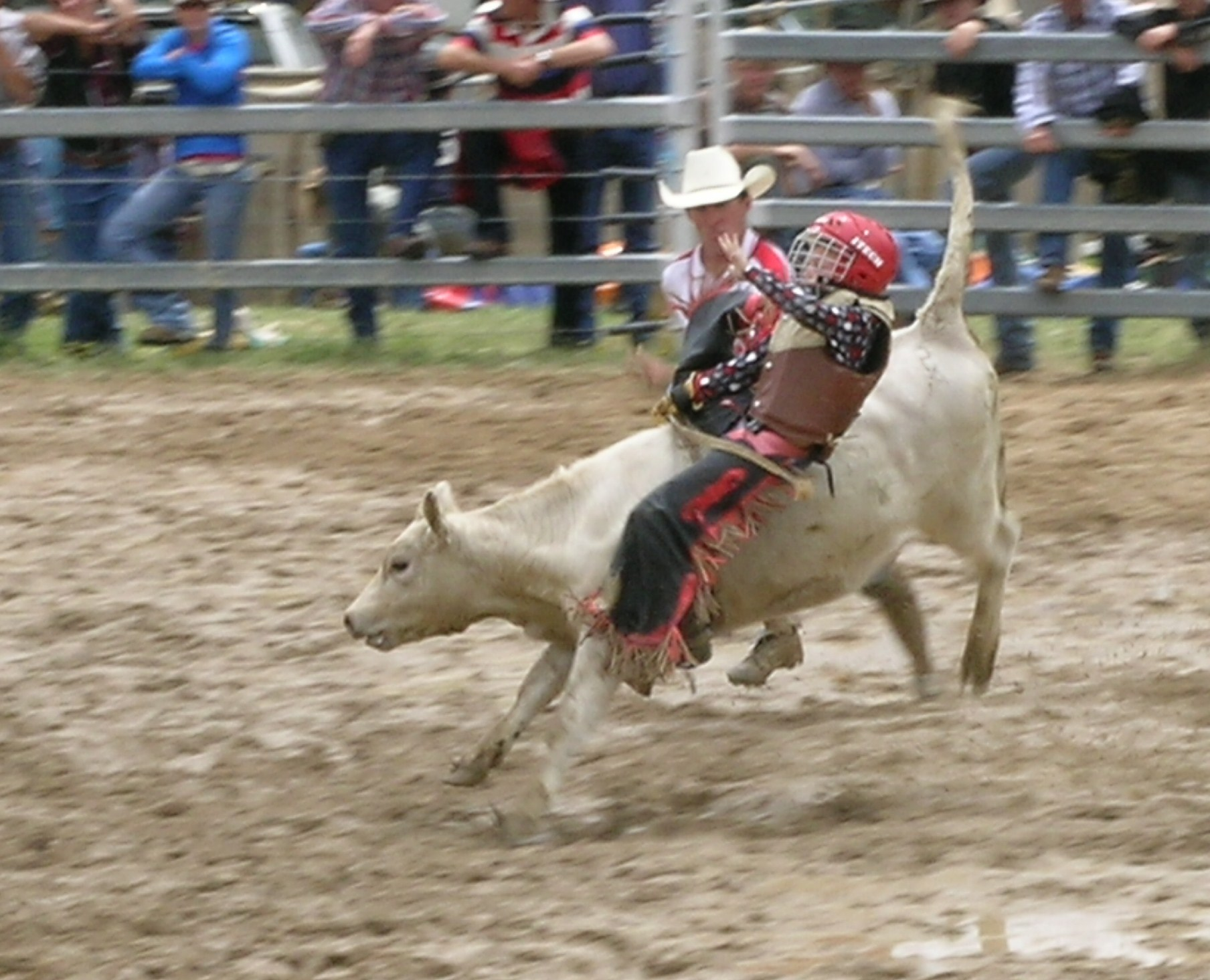
A rodeo clown assisting a junior calf rider.

Some of the outstanding early buckjumpers were "Bobs", "Rocky Ned" and later the grey mare, "Curio". "Rocky Ned" was known as the "four-legged fury" and became somewhat a legend with several riders including Jack Reilly, Gordon Attwater and Lyn Smith claiming to be the first or only one to ride him. Gordon Attwater is the one rider who has an undisputed claim to success, when he rode "Rocky Ned" in 1929 at Grafton, New South Wales. Attwater suffered for several days afterwards, though. At 27 years of age, "Rocky Ned" was still Australia's most famous buckjumper. He was bucked at the Thorpe McConville shows from 1934 to 1940 and was unridden during this time.

During the early days of bushmen's carnivals the local committees owned their own buckjumpers (broncos) which were agisted by local graziers. Local residents also supplemented these mobs with rogue buckjumpers that were difficult to ride. The cattle, bullocks, steers and calves were and still are owned by local graziers that lend them for the campdrafting and rodeo events. Nowadays stock contractors supply both associations with buckjumpers, bulls, dogging steers and calves for the roping events. Contract stock has produced a more uniform range of bucking stock which are also quieter to handle.

Chainsaw was one of Australia's most famous bucking bulls. Only nine contestants scored on him and he won the Australian national title of Bull of the Year a world record eight times during 1987 to 1994.

There are strict standards for the selection, care and treatment of rodeo livestock, arenas, plus equipment requirements and specifications.

== Riders ==
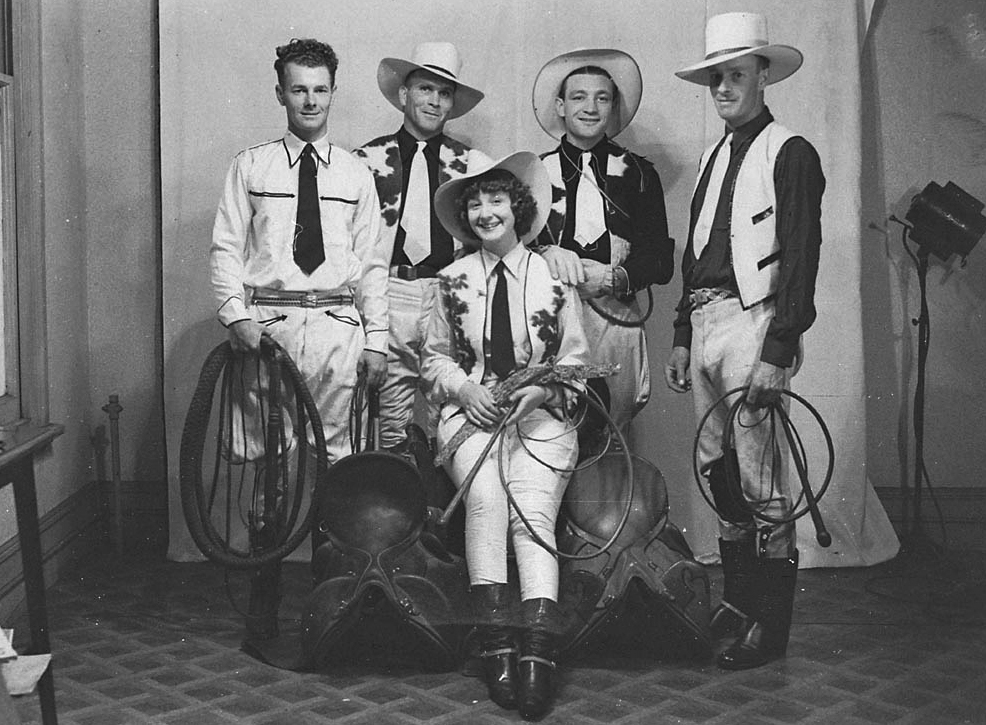
Australian rodeo riders, 1938, by Sam Hood

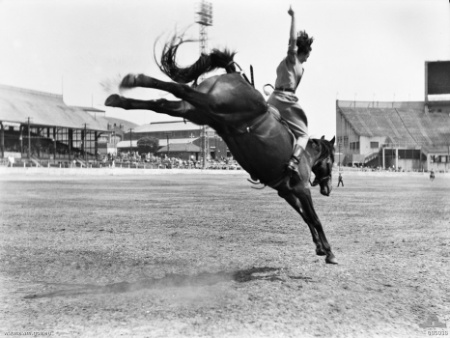
Beryl Riley riding a buckjumper at the Sydney Royal Easter Show.

The early buckjumper riders were known as roughriders. Australian cowboys at that time were the youths or old men that handled the milking cows on stations and did general duties around the homestead.

Some of the top roughriders of the 1920s included Alan McPhee, Colin McLeod, Dan Edwards, Hilton McTaggart and Jack Stanton. In 1964 Queenslander, Doug Flanigan, became the first Australian to win a major competition when he won the bareback ride at the Calgary Stampede.

The Australian Bushmen's Campdraft & Rodeo Association (ABCRA) members who are winners and placegetters in recognised events are awarded points that are used to determine inductees into the annual National Champions Hall of Fame. John Caban, Glenn Morgan, Ron Raynor and Kevin Cooper are among the most successful inductees with at least ten awards each. Top riders from the APRA include Bernie Smythe jnr., Bonnie Young, Vic Gough, Ray Crawford, John Duncombe, Doug Flanigan, Shane Kenny, Darren Clarke, Brad Pierce, Scott Fraser and Jim McGuire who was All-Round Champion Cowboy five times (1967, 1969, 1970, 1975 and 1976).

In 1988 Dave Appleton from Clermont, Queensland won the Professional Rodeo Cowboys Association All-Around Rodeo Championship in America. Bernie Smythe won Australian titles before gaining international successes during 1990 and 1992, in Canada, where he now lives. In 1997 and 1998 Australian, Troy Dunn became the top bull rider of the world. Glenn O'Neill from NSW, moved to the United States and dramatically increased his earnings there, before becoming the world champion bronco rider in 2002 and a runner-up the following year.

Carl Green from Walcha, New South Wales was a winner of the 2009 National High School Finals Rodeo "All Around Rookie Cowboy" at Farmington, New Mexico.

Violet Skuthorpe was an outstanding lady roughrider, who in 1938, was invited to join the McCoy's Wild West Show in America and she (then 15) toured there along with her mother and brother Lance, 19. Also travelling with the show were three other Australians, Art Creasy, Jack Watson and Ron McPhee. Violet was billed as the "World's Champion Lady Buckjump Rider" after the American tour. Kitty Gill, Gladys Gill and Beryl Riley were other notable lady roughriders. In 1947 the ARRA decided that women competitors should have their stirrups tied. It is estimated that there were about 20 to 25 women who regularly competing in about 1944 to 1951. Later more there were more women competing as rodeos became more popular. Nowadays the women's events consist of barrel racing, breakaway roping and steer undecorating. Marie Edwards won the ABCRA All-Round Cowgirl a record five times from 1988 to 1994.

== Governing organisations ==
In August 1944 the Australian Bushmen's Carnival Association (ABCA) was formed by the Royal Agricultural Society of New South Wales, as a result of the increase in the number of bushmen's carnivals. The purpose of this formation was to standardise regulations and rules, but insufficient support was given and the association was terminated in 1947. Another national association, for professional riders, the Australian Rough Rider's Association (ARRA) was formed on 1 January 1945 with Ron Boardman as chairman and R. M. Williams as secretary. Later that year this association adapted and adopted American rules and regulations for their competitions. They held their first rodeos in South Australia and the "Hoofs & Horns" magazine publicised and supported this group. The ARRA adopted a standard saddle, for the buckjumping, which had a 15-inch tree, 2¼ inch kneepads and was held in place with a crupper and girth. In 1988 the ARRA changed their name to the Australian Professional Rodeo Association (APRA).

On 28 March 1946 the Northern (N.S.W.) Bushmen's Carnival Association was founded at Maitland, New South Wales. The name was again changed in 1960 to the Australian Bushmen's Carnival Association. On 17 July 1985 the association became a company limited by guarantee, and had yet another name change, to the Australian Bushmen's Campdraft & Rodeo Association (ABCRA). The ARRA had more good roughriders though, and in 1957 in a Sydney Royal Show competition between the top 25 roughriders from each association the ARRA riders won all of the events.

These two associations gained considerable support and most local bodies are affiliated with one or other of them. They provided affiliated committees by co-ordinating and assisting all carnivals with standard gear, rules for events and a form of insurance against injuries sustained in competitions. The ABCRA has over 4,800 members and many more 'day competitors', which makes it the largest rodeo and campdraft organisation in Australia. This association has approximately 200 affiliated committees across the country running events that attract numerous competitors and many hundreds of thousands of spectators annually.

In May 1992 the National Rodeo Council of Australia (NRCA) was formed to further the sport of rodeo and has represented the following associations:

- Australian Bushmen's Campdraft & Rodeo Association (ABCRA)
- Australian Professional Bull Riders Association (APBA)
- Central Rodeo Cowboys Association (CRCA)
- Indigenous Rodeo Riders Australia (IRRA)
- National Student Rodeo Association (NSRA)
- National Rodeo Association (NRA)
- Northern Cowboys Association (NCA)
- Queensland Rodeo Association (QRA)
- Rodeo Services Association (RSA)
- West Coast Rodeo Circuit (WCRC)

== See also ==
- Buckjumping
- Campdrafting
- Cowboy
- Equestrian Australia
- Equestrianism
- Rodeo bareback rigging
- Rodeo clown
- Station (Australian agriculture)
