= John Sinclair-Hill =

Australian polo player (1933/1934–2025)

John Sinclair Leslie Hill (1933 or 1934 – 9 November 2025) was an Australian 10-goal polo player. He was a founding inductee of the Australian Polo Federation Hall of Fame. He was appointed an Officer of the British Empire in the 1980 Queen's Birthday Honours for service to polo. He was made a Member of the Order of Australia in the 2008 Australia Day Honours for "service to the community, particularly as a supporter of cultural and Indigenous organisations in Moree". Sinclair-Hill died on 9 November 2025, at the age of 91.

He taught King Charles III, then the Prince of Wales, how to play polo.
