= Neil McNeil (businessman) =

Australian railway contractor and businessman

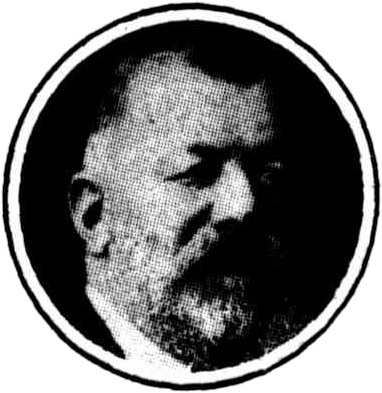
Neil McNeil, c. 1927

Neil McNeil (30 December 1855 – 8 May 1927) was a prominent Australian businessman who was significant in the development of railways across Australia along with Western Australia's timber industry.

McNeil was born in the Scottish town of Dingwall as the second son of Neil MacNeil (1827–1915), a railway contractor, and Elizabeth (née Urquhart). He emigrated to Victoria with his family at about the age of five and settled in Ballarat, attending Ballarat College. He then joined his father's business, soon becoming superintendent, before becoming a contractor in his own right and constructing railways in South Australia, Victoria, and Tasmania, along with the metropolitan water supply scheme in Hobart. McNeil came to Western Australia in 1882. In 1894 he was the builder of The Cliffe in Peppermint Grove. He built some of Western Australia's earlier railways. The Jarrahdale–Bunbury railway was proposed in 1888, and in 1893 Neil McNeil & Co constructed the Jarrahdale Junction to Pinjarra, then Pinjarra to Picton Junction lines. The last railway constructed was the Geraldton–Mullewa railway in 1894, also known as the Narngulu to Mullewa railway. McNeil founded Jarrahdale Jarrah Forests and Railways Ltd in 1897. He was managing director of the Jarrahdale company until the 1902 amalgamation with Millars. In 1905 he was put forward as a potential Lord Mayor of Perth; however, he did not achieve the position.

Other business interests included mines, orchards in Mount Barker and the Blackwood River area which exported fruit, and horse breeding for carriages. McNeil was also the owner of real estate holdings, some of which were disposed of in 1915. He also founded the Perth Polo Club.

He was married to Jessie (née Laurie) from 1890 until his death on 8 May 1927. He is buried in the Presbyterian section of Karrakatta Cemetery. The Mcneil house at Perth's Presbyterian Ladies' College is named after him.

== See also ==
- M. C. Davies, another early figure in the Western Australian timber industry
