= 1980 Queen's Birthday Honours (Australia) =

Annual honours for Australia

The 1980 Queen's Birthday Honours for Australia were appointments to recognise and reward good works by citizens of Australia and other nations that contribute to Australia. The Birthday Honours are awarded as part of the Queen's Official Birthday celebrations and were announced on 14 June 1980 in Australia.

The recipients of honours are displayed as they were styled before their new honour and arranged by honour with grades and then divisions i.e. Civil, Diplomatic and Military as appropriate.

== Order of Australia ==
=== Companion (AC) ===
==== General Division ====
- Helen Grey Annetta, Lady Cutler DStJ – For public and community service to the people of New South Wales.
- Sir (George) Russell Drysdale – For service to art.
- Ralph Lindsay Harry CBE – For public service, particularly as a diplomatic representative.
- Major General Sir William (Dudley) Refshauge CBE, ED – For public service, and service to the medical profession, particularly in the field of public health.

=== Officer (AO) ===
==== General Division ====
- Dr Donald Douglas Brown – For service to industry.
- John Langdon Bonython – For service to the media and to industry.
- Richard Norman Hamilton Denton – For service to the accounting profession.
- Clifford Ormond Dolan – For service to trade unionism.
- Professor John Bernard Hickie – For service to medicine.
- Marshall Lewis Johnston – For public service as a diplomatic representative.
- Emeritus Professor Denis Oswald Jordan – For service to education.
- Lachlan De Salis Nicholson MBE – For service to the tourist industry.
- Earl Ronald Owen – For service to medicine, particularly in the field of microsurgery.
- Alderman Douglas Robert Plaister MBE – For service to local government, to the community and to sport.
- John Boyd Reid – For service to industry.
- Kenneth Brian Stonier – For service to the publishing industry and to the community.
- Dr Douglas Frew Waterhouse CMG – For public service in the field of entomology

==== Military Division ====
Royal Australian Navy

- Rear Admiral John Davidson – For service to the Royal Australian Navy and the Defence Force, particularly as Head, Australian Defence Staff, Washington.
- Rear Admiral Andrew John Robertson DSC – For service to the Royal Australian Navy and the Defence Force, particularly as Head, Australian Defence Staff, London.

Australian Army

- Major General Alan Lindsay Morrison DSO, MBE – For service to the Australian Army, particularly as the Commandant, Royal Military College, Duntroon.
- Major General William Joseph Watson MBE, QHP – For service to the Royal Australian Army Medical Corps, particularly as Director of Army Health Services.

Royal Australian Air Force

- Air Vice-Marshal Harold Kevin Parker – For service to the Royal Australian Air Force, particularly as Chief of Air Force Personnel.
- Air Commodore Keith Tongue – For service to the Royal Australian Air Force, particularly as Officer Commanding Royal Australian Air Force Base Richmond, N.S.W.

=== Member (AM) ===
==== General Division ====
- Henry Thomas Alce – For service to the liquor industry and to the community.
- Clive Lyof Amadio – For service to music.
- Queenie Ashton (Mrs Cover) – For service to the performing arts.
- Thea Beatrice May Astley (Mrs Gregson) – For service to literature.
- Donald Oscar Banks – For service to music.
- Eric Walter Barnard – For parliamentary and community service.
- Maston Beard – For public service in the field of radio physics.
- Alderman Margaret Ellen Bond – For service to local government and to the community.
- Peter Geoffrey Brock – For service to the sport of motor racing.
- Maurice Armstrong Buckley – For service to handicapped children.
- Edward Francis Charlton – For service to the sport of snooker.
- The Reverend Bernard Angus Clarke – For service to Aboriginal welfare.
- John Coburn – For service to art.
- Douglas Harry Cohen – For service to medicine, particularly in the field of paediatrics.
- James Slade Collins – For service to the sport of billiards and snooker.
- Bruce William Devlin – For service to the sport of golf.
- Eileen Marie Dyer – For community service.
- Robert Locke Finch – For service to commerce and to town planning.
- David Howells Fleay MBE – For service to wildlife conservation.
- Dr Stanley Jack Marcus Goulston MC – For service to medicine.
- Anthony George Worsley Greatorex OBE, MC – For community service.
- Eugeniusz Hardy – For service to migrant welfare.
- Dr Robert Harris MBE – For service to the dental profession.
- Peter Firman Harrison – For service to town planning.
- George Herbert Hawkes – For service to the community and to the arts.
- The Reverend Dr Siegfried Paul Hebart – For service to religious education.
- Merle Elaine Hurcomb – For community service.
- The Reverend Sydney John Jenkins ED – For service to religion and to the community.
- Francis Patrick Johnson – For service to the tourist industry.
- Desmond Percy Kelly – For service to aviation.
- William Edward Lancaster CBE – For public service as Director of the Zoological Gardens of South Australia.
- James Robert Landman – For public service.
- Norman Spilsbury Lane – For service to the chemical industry and to the rehabilitation of alcoholics.
- The Honourable Leslie Arthur Logan – For service to Parliament and to the community.
- Frank P. Lowy – For community service and for service to the sport of soccer.
- The Very Reverend Dr Neil Macleod – For service to religion.
- Harold Gordon Marshall – For public service as a diplomatic representative.
- Professor Henry Mayer – For service to education.
- Ruth Gertrude McClelland (Mrs Rister) – For service to nursing.
- Brother Gerald Francis Joachim McGrath – For service to the education of handicapped children.
- Robert Peter McMillan DFC – For service to conservation.
- Ena Emily Miles – For community service.
- Claude John Millar – For service in the field of Aboriginal welfare.
- Charles Robert Mortensen – For service to commerce and industry,
- Kelvin David George Nagle – For service to the sport of golf.
- Ian Milton Nisbet – For service to commerce and to the community.
- David Leon Pank AFC – For service to industry.
- Dorothy Faith Patterson – For service to education.
- Peter Hugh Pigott – For community service.
- Harold Charles Richards – For service to technical education.
- Edwin John Lindsay Ride – For public service as a diplomatic representative.
- Dr Sandy Edwin John Robertson – For service to medicine, particularly in the field of paediatrics.
- Anthony Keith Robin Russell – For service to education and to industrial design.
- Bartholomew Carrack Ryan – For service to the mining industry.
- Dr Edward Clifford Lee Dawson Ryan – For service to medicine and to the community.
- Reuben Sackville – For service to commerce and to the community.
- Andrew John See – For public service.
- Andrew Bruce Sinclair – For service to the engineering profession.
- Dr Grigorij Abramovitch Sklovsky – For service in the field of radio broadcasting.
- Keith Archibald Smith OBE – For public service in the field of railway transport.
- Thistle Yolette Stead – For service to wildlife conservation.
- Frederick Leslie Charles Taylor – For public service.
- Marjory Alice Hamlet Taylor (Mrs Walkowski) – For service to nursing.
- Rex Osborne Thiele – For service to commerce and to the accounting profession.
- Herman John Thumm – For service to tourism and to the wine industry.
- Robert Noel Tinning – For service to medicine, particularly in the field of orthopaedics.
- Richard Neil Townsend – For public service.
- Dr Ronald Campbell Webb – For public service.
- The Honourably Gerald Percy Wild MBE ED – For parliamentary service.

==== Military Division ====
Royal Australian Navy

- Captain Michael Calder – For service in the field of hydrography and particularly as Hydrographer, Royal Australian Navy.
- Captain Neil Ralph DSC – For service in establishing the Royal Australian Navy Staff College.

Australian Army

- Lieutenant Colonel Kenneth Gordon Anderson – For service in the field of logistic operations.
- Lieutenant Colonel Reginald Patrick Beesley – For service as the Commanding Officer, Special Air Service Regiment.
- Colonel Frederick Kevin Cole – For leadership of the Australian Contingent of the Commonwealth Monitoring Force in Southern Rhodesia.
- Lieutenant Colonel Leslie Philan Hubble – For service with the Australian Contingent of the Commonwealth Monitoring Force in Southern Rhodesia.
- Colonel John Brock Westphalen ED – For service in the Army Reserve as a member of the Logistic Planning Staff of Headquarters Field Force Command.
- Lieutenant Colonel Trevor John Wilkinson – For service in support of the Reserve Forces.

Royal Australian Air Force

- Group Captain James Robert Bartram – For service as Commanding Officer of the Royal Australian Air Force School of Technical Training.
- Group Captain James Dunne – For service as Commanding Officer of No. 7 Stores Depot, Royal Australian Air Force.
- Wing Commander Nicholas Leray-Meyer – For service as Commanding Officer, Number 9 Squadron, Royal Australian Air Force.

=== Medal (OAM) ===
==== General Division ====
- The Reverend Douglas Charles Abbott – For service to the Welfare of Members of the Defence Force
- Teresa Vera Alfonzi – For services to the community
- Claude Allan Anderson – For service to the field of engineering design and planning
- Hiram Francis Angove – For service to the sport of basketball.
- Leslie George Gibson Atyeo – For service to the community
- Ian Leslie Auhl – For service to the community
- Enid Dorothy Bakewell – For service to the community
- Alec Malcolm Baldock – For service to the community and local government
- Derek Curtin Barnard – For service to community service, particularly in providing a Marine Safety Radio service
- Desmond Arthur Beer – For service to the community
- Livio Benedetti – For service to the welfare of migrants
- John Charles Stuart Bennett – For service to the Scout Association of Australia
- Albert Kevin Bindon – For service to the community
- Leonard John Bland – For service to the handicapped
- Ronald Bleakley – For service to the community
- Maurice James Bolton – For service to the community and the Public Service
- Francis Roger Bourke – For service to the community
- Daphne May Bragg – For service to the community
- Andrew James Brodie, BEM – For service to the community
- Elvy Curtis Brown – For service to the community
- George Buckton – For service to the sport of casting.
- Lavinia Sylvia Burges – For service to handicapped persons
- Brian Vincent Byrnes – For service to the community and local government
- The Rev Father Sebastian Emmanuel Camilleri – For service to the community and religion
- Victor Thomas Carell – For service to the theatre
- Darcy Cyril Carter – For service to the community and commerce
- Mabel Florence Cavanough – For services to the community
- Lily Cheney – For service to the community
- Frederick John William Clarke – For service to the community
- Lola Cousemacker – For service to youth welfare
- James Leslie Borlace Cowan – For service to the aviation industry
- Francis George Cox – For service to the community and local government
- James Baden-Powell Crabtree – For service to aged persons' welfare
- Russell Nelson Crook, QPM – For service to the community and ex-service personnel
- Donald George Wallace Crosby – For service to the media and to the theatre
- Avy Curley – For service to the community
- Joseph Albert Darcy – For service to the sport of boxing and to youth welfare.
- Joseph Keith Beresford Dawson – For service to the community and local government
- William Gordon Percival Dawson – For service to the community
- Dorothy Eva Isabell Dodd – For service to music
- Eileen Veronica Dooley – For service to the community
- Mabel Evelyn Downes – For service to the community
- Albert Ernest Edwards – For service to the public
- Flora Julia Fairlie – For service to child welfare
- Severino Mario Feleppa – For service to migrant welfare
- William George Forward – For service to amateur sports
- Josef Freeman – For service to the community
- Philip Leslie Geeves – For service to the education and history
- Jack Wilfred Granger – For service to the community and to local government
- Ivor Stanley George Gregg – For service to the aviation industry
- William Robert Hagboom – For community service
- Harold William Haimes – For community service
- Nennie Harken – For service to education
- Donald Dunstan Harris – For service to the Scout Association of Australia
- Frank William Harrison –For service to the sport of Australian Football
- Eric Roland Hayman – For service to the sport of wrestling and to the sport of volleyball
- Francis William Hely – For public service
- Vieno Helena Hentula – For service in the field of migrant welfare.
- Sheila Hewitt – For community service.
- Vincent Joseph Higgins – For service to trade unionism.
- Edna Mary Hitchcox – For service to handicapped persons.
- Shirley Colbourne Hogben – For community service.
- Florence May Holt – For community service.
- Rodney Jack (Peter) Hutchings – For public service.
- George Alexander Jackson – For community service.
- Edward James Jane – For community service.
- Margaret Anne Johanson – For service to youth welfare.
- Mavis Evyln Johnson – For community service.
- Morna Madaline Jones – For community service.
- Mary Isabell Josiffe – For service to the sport of Hockey.
- Stephen Keir – For service to industry and to the community.
- Solomon Kellerman – For community service.
- John Kennedy – For service to the community.
- Henry Michael Kennendy – For service to local government and to the community.
- John Edward Henry Kennett – For community service.
- Nancy Caroline Kenny – For service to the sport of netball.
- Norman Eric Kessell – For service to the theatre.
- William Stanley Kruger, DFC – For public service
- Sheila Merlyn Kruse – For community service
- Richard George Lane – For service to the sport of scuba diving
- Charles Henry David Layzell – For public service
- Nellie Frances Lee – For community service
- Ivan Norrie Livermore – For service to country racing
- Thomas Gilbert Lyddon – For community service.
- Brian Herbert Maguire – For community service
- Robert Austin McCallum – For community service
- Donald John McEachern – For community service
- Colin Lindsay McKirdy – For community service
- Archibald James Arthur McLardie – For community service
- Edna Highfield Mary McLennan – For community service
- Vincent Sidney McMullen – For community service
- Mother Joan (Miss Elsie Sinclair Mitchell) – For community service.
- Giuliano Montagna – For service to journalism
- Colin Alexander Moon – For community service
- Brother Thomas More (John R. Davidson) – For service in the field of youth welfare
- Maurice Stephen Khoury Moubarak – For service in the field of migrant welfare
- Hylton Joseph Nagle – For community service
- Ronald Stewart Nelson – For service to the sport of fishing
- David Gordon Nicolson – For community service.
- Samuel Charles Frederick North – For community service
- Violet Alice O'Donell – For community service.
- Ronald Leo O'Donnell – For service to the sport of cycling.
- Robert Lionel Pash – For service to local government
- Pamela Perry – For community service and for service in the field of Aboriginal welfare
- Sarah Leah Phillips – For service to the sport of swimming
- Angell Arthur Phillips – For service to education
- Dr Athol Herbert Robertson – For community service
- William Harrie Reed Robinson – For community service
- John William Alfred Rosewell – For service to the sport of surf life saving
- Brenda Amanda Russell – For community service
- Richard John Rust – For public service and for service to the Post Office Historical Society
- Leonore Ryan – For service in the field of international community welfare
- Ernest Frank Sachse – For community service
- Albert Christian Schluter – For service to the community and to migrant welfare
- Charles Thomas Seeney – For community service
- Caroline Mary Serventy – For service to conservation
- James Herbert Skinner – For community service
- Reverend Noel Smith – For community service
- Betty Monica Spears – For service to trade unionism
- Ronald William Stewart – For service to local government and to the community.
- Kenneth Stirrup – For public service
- Walter McDouall Stuart – For service to technical education particularly in the field of Marine Engineering
- Hendrik Suijdendorp – For service to agriculture
- Cecil Sullivan – For service to local government
- Endre Joseph Szakall – For service to the sport of fencing
- Evelyn Hicks Tavener – For service to the sport of hockey
- Gregory Lawton Taylor – For service to education and to the community
- Betty Dawn Taylor – For community service
- Eustace Richard Tracey – For community service
- Douglas George Trask – For service to local government and to the community
- Nellie Turner – For community service
- Joy Nancy Twining – For service to the sport of badminton
- Dr (Evelyn) Anne Urban – For service to handicapped children
- Nancy Campbell Vibert – For community service
- Harold Gordon (Bill) Vincent – For community service
- Donald Wait – For service to technical education, particularly in the field of panel beating
- Robert William Waldron – For public service
- Janet Elizabeth Walker – For community service
- Ronald Earle Walker – For community service
- Donald Walter Whitbread – For service to music
- Donald Richard Gilbert White – For service to local government
- Albert Edward Wickes, ISM –For community service
- Clement George Williamson – For service to the local government and to the community
- Norman Bruce Wilson QFSM – For service to the sports of surf life saving and golf
- John Cuthbert Wilson – For community service
- Dr Ivan Donald Wittwer – For community service
- Audrey Worthington – For community service
- Edgar Frederick Wykes – For service to the sport of cricket
- Linda Elizabeth Yeo – For community service

==== Military Division ====
Royal Australian Navy

- Warrant Officer Peter James Figg – For service in the field of Naval Communications.
- Warrant Officer Matyas Rudolph Holzl – For service to the Royal Australian Navy in the fields of technology and administration.
- Warrant Officer John Bertram McClymont – For service in training Royal Australian Navy personnel.

Australian Army

- Warrant Officer Class One Kevern Albert Billings – For service to the Australian Army, particularly in the field of telegraphic communications.
- Warrant Officer Class Two Richard John James Jeffrey – For service with the Australian Contingent of the Commonwealth Monitoring Force in Southern Rhodesia.
- Warrant Officer Class One Bernard Lancelot Le Sueur MM – For service in the field of small arms training.
- Warrant Officer Qass One Robert John Pink – For service to the Army Reserve.
- Warrant Officer Class One Raymond Thorncraft – For service in the Quartermaster field of the Royal Australian Armoured Corps.

Royal Australian Air Force

- Warrant Officer Peter Klasups – For service as a warrant officer engineer at Number 481 Squadron, Royal Australian Air Force.
- Warrant Officer Joseph Lloyd McCloy – For service as a warrant officer engineer at Number 3 Aircraft Depot, Royal Australian Air Force.
- Warrant Officer Bruce William Merson – For service as a technical spares assessor at Headquarters Support Command, Royal Australian Air Force.

== Knight Bachelor ==
- Victor George Burley, CBE – For public service.
- Peter John Derham – For service to industry.
- Andrew Sheppard Grimwade, CBE – For service to industry and commerce.
- Kenneth Spencer May, CBE – For service to the media.
- Keith Charles Owen Shann, CBE – For public service.

== Order of the Bath ==
=== Companion of the Order of the Bath (CB) ===
Civil Division

- James Rowland Odgers, CBE – For public service.

== Order of Saint Michael and Saint George ==
=== Knight Commander of the Order of St Michael and St George (KCMG) ===
- Sir Robert Crichton-Brown, CBE, TD – For service to commerce and the community.

=== Companion of the Order of St Michael and St George (CMG) ===
- Peter Charles Alexander, OBE – For service to veterans.
- Leonard Gordon Darling – For service to industry and commerce.
- Stuart Leslie Devlin – For service to the art of design.
- Trevor Alfred Dinning – For service to medicine.
- The Honourable Rendle McNeilage (Mac) Holten – For parliamentary and community service.

== Order of the British Empire ==
=== Knight Commander of the Order of the British Empire (KBE) ===
Civil Division

- The Most Reverend James Patrick O'Collins, – For service to religion and the community.
- Professor Bruce Rodda Williams – For service to education and government.

=== Dame Commander of the Order of the British Empire (DBE) ===
Civil Division

- Professor Ida Caroline Mann, CBE – For service to Aboriginal welfare.

=== Commander of the Order of the British Empire (CBE) ===
Civil Division

- William Henry (Harry) Butler, MBE – For service to the community and the environment.
- Martyn Rudolph Finger – For public service.
- Patrick John Vance Ramsden – For service to commerce and the community.
- Arthur William Shepherd, MBE – For service to primary industry.

=== Officer of the Order of the British Empire (OBE) ===
Civil Division

- Patricia Jean (Patsy) Adam-Smith – For service to literature.
- Malcolm Edmund Brooks – For service to the community.
- Kay Cathrine Millin Brownbill – For service to the community.
- Thomas Ross Burrell – For service to commerce.
- Paris Chambers, JP – For service to insurance and the community.
- Dr. Arthur Ashley Cooper – For service to the building industry.
- John Rowland Dart – For service to the community.
- Vivian Frederick Davey – For service to health and science.
- James Henry Dolphin – For service in defence production.
- Roy Dowell – For public service.
- Rabbi Dr. Alfred Fabian, ED – For service to Religion.
- William Thomas Hare – For public service.
- Harvey Francis Hayes – For service to local government.
- John Sinclair Leslie Hill – For service to polo.
- Mirrie Irma Hill – For service to music.
- Emeritus Professor Victor David Hopper – For service to education.
- Dr. Rodney James Hudson – For service to community health.
- John Raymond Huelin – For service to law and the community.
- Dr. Thomas Henry Hurley – For service to medicine.
- Dr. Laurel Jean Macintosh – For service to women.
- Samuel Mitchell Frederick Martin, MC – For service to the transport industry.
- Desmond Vincent O'Leary – For public service
- William Joseph (Bill) O'Reilly – For service to cricket and journalism.
- Councillor Frederick Arthur Rogers, MBE – For service to local government.
- William Ewart Gladstone Salter – For service to industry in Western Australia.
- Ivan Henry Smith – For public service.
- Terence Vaughan, MBE – For service to the performing arts.
- Michael Hayden Walsh – For service to the performing arts.
- Dr. William Thomas Williams – For service to science.
- Roger Robert Woodward – For service to the performing arts.

=== Member of the Order of the British Empire (MBE) ===
==== Military Division ====
Royal Australian Navy

- Lieutenant Paul Conrad Johnson.
- Senior Chaplain the Venerable Archdeacon Walter Thomas Wheeldon.
- Commander Robert Hunter Woolrych.

Australian Army

- Major Patrick Albert William Brook, Royal Australian Infantry Corps.
- Major William Ernest Kaine, Royal Australian Infantry Corps.
- Major Joseph Paul Thursky, Royal Australian Army Ordnance Corps.
- Major Richard Milson Tucker, Royal Australian Infantry Corps.
- Major Michael Desmond Webb, ED, Royal Australian Engineers.

Royal Australian Air Force

- Squadron Leader Margaret Lynn Baxter.
- Squadron Leader Graeme Robert Crombie.
- Squadron Leader Lancelot John Halvorson.
- Squadron Leader Brian Desmond McLean.

==== Civil Division ====
- Arthur George Ambrose, JP – For service to the community.
- Lyle Edgar Baker – For service to the community.
- Reginald George Baker – For service to local government.
- Alderman Noel Frank Bullpitt – For service to local government and sport.
- Norman Alfred Coleman – For service to sport and commerce
- William Edward Cook, JP – For service to the community.
- Barbara Critten – For service to the community
- Mervyn Twynam Davis – For public service.
- Frederick John Dorman – For service to sport.
- Gladys Barbara (Nancy) Eastick – For service to guiding.
- Keith Eddy, JP – For public service.
- Lex Ellwood – For service to local government and the community.
- Edwin Kingston Geach – For service to the community.
- Arthur Bruce Golding – For service to the community.
- Joan Patricia Gortley – For service to the community.
- William John Gray – For service to local government.
- Alan Stanley Jones – For service to motor racing.
- Alan Gabriel Jones – For public service arid service to engineering.
- Captain Eirianydd Jones – For service to shipping.
- Cynthia Loveday – For public service.
- Elizabeth Mary McDonald – For service to the handicapped.
- Daniel Philip McElligott – For public service.
- William Hector McMillan – For public service and service to the performing arts.
- Alexander Graham McNaughton – For service to aviation.
- Arnold Newhouse – For service to the Jewish community.
- Edward Websdale Painter – For service to the community.
- Peter Shaw Parkinson – For service to architecture.
- Peggy Pelchen – For service to politics and the community.
- Matron Mary Louisa Pike Corke – For service to the community and health.
- William John Raper – For service to rugby league football.
- Arthur Derek Roff – For service to wildlife conservation.
- Joyce Mary Ross – For service to Aboriginal welfare and linguistics.
- Ralph Aaron Samuel – For service to the aged and the Jewish community.
- Walter Wilhelm Schauble – For service to the ethnic community and communications.
- Vera Searle – For service to veterans.
- Reverend Percy McDonald Smith – For service to Aboriginal welfare.
- Reverend Joseph Tainton – For service to religion.
- Albert Dominic Taylor – For public service.
- William Ewart Tucker – For service to the community.
- Patricia Tuffs – For service to the community.
- Leonard Alphonsus Walshe – For service to health and the community.
- Councillor Eric Hodgson Woods – For service to local government.
- Virgilio Emmanuel Zammit – For service to migrants.

== Companion of the Imperial Service Order (ISO) ==
- Harold Martin Ford – For public service.
- Mostyn Allen Williams – For public service.

== British Empire Medal (BEM) ==
=== Military Division ===
==== Royal Australian Navy ====
- Chief Petty Officer Thomas Keith Burr.
- Petty Officer Douglas Albert Sheaff.

==== Australian Army ====
- Corporal John Dennis Darrington, Royal Australian Engineers.
- Sergeant Denis Charles Hare, Royal Australian Corps of Signals.
- Sergeant Michael Charles Jacob, Royal Australian Armoured Corps.
- Sergeant Alan James Palmer, Royal Australian Engineers.
- Staff Sergeant Douglas Harold Robertson, Royal Australian Infantry Corps.
- Sergeant Christopher Robert James Thomas, Royal Corps of Australian Electrical and Mechanical Engineers.

==== Royal Australian Air Force ====
- Sergeant James Arthur Redmond Birrell.
- Flight Sergeant Gary David Bydder.
- Flight Sergeant Brian Charles Clayton.
- Flight Sergeant, Gordon Phillip Nicholls.

=== Civil Division ===
Civil Division

- Florence Sylvia Bartram – For service to the community.
- Cecil John Biffin – For service to the community.
- Flora Ethel Buckley – For service to youth and the community.
- Raymond Francis Byrne – For public service.
- George Joseph Baxter Casey – For service to the community.
- Hamilton Collis – For service to sport and the community.
- Leslie Mervyn Gerald Cox – For service to the community.
- Violet Madge Curran – For service to veterans.
- May Joan Davis – For public service.
- Percival Vincent Dunning – For service to the community.
- Blanche Phyllis Anne Emery – For service to the aged.
- William Fidler – For service to amateur sport.
- Sybil Victoria Franklin – For service to the community.
- Norma Ernestine Free – For service to the community.
- Joan Marie Therese Fuller – For public service.
- Geoffrey Leo Gard – For service to the community and to sport.
- Thelma Adeline Geddie – For service to the community.
- Hilary Robin Gifford – For public service.
- Patricia Margery Hall – For public service.
- Michael John Hassed – For service to the community and to sport.
- John George Hay – For service to the community and youth.
- Mary Kathleen Keefe – For public service.
- Aubrey Francis King – For service to the community.
- Merle Leighton – For public service.
- Ruby Eileen Leslie – For service to the community and to the deaf.
- Thomas Averil Lewis – For public service.
- David John Mccarthy – For service to the community.
- Annie Flora McGowan – For service to the community.
- Euphemia McIndoe – For service to veterans.
- Mildred Mary McLeod – For service to the community.
- Sarah Myrtle Marshall – For service to legacy.
- Lillian Florence Monk – For service to the community.
- Gladys May Munro – For public service.
- Edward Ranald Newbery – For service to the community and to music.
- Ernest Patrick O'Brien – For service to the community.
- Mary Elizabeth O'Connor – For public service.
- Tadeus Paprocki – For public service.
- Arthur John Powe – For service to the disabled.
- Belle Craig Powe – For service to the disabled.
- Dorothy Elizabeth Prince – For service to amateur athletics.
- Lena Regan – For service to the community and to music.
- Maud Wyndham Rien – For service to the community.
- William Richard Rien – For service, to the community.
- Lawrence Robertson – For public service and to veterans.
- Ranville Rex Schofield – For service to the community.
- Urbano Alberto (Albert) Segafredo – For service to migrants and to the community.
- Edith Irene Seller – For service to the community.
- Richard George Smith – For public service.
- Vambola Veinberg – For public service.
- Joyce Minnie Walden – For service to the community and to the handicapped.
- John Neil Weekes – For public service.
- Jan Wicker – For public service.
- Gena Mavis Veronica Williams – For public service.
- Ernest Melville Wilson – For public service.

== Queen's Police Medal ==
- William John Jacobs, Senior Constable, Northern Territory Police.
- Charles William Porter, Assistant Commissioner, Northern Territory Police.

== Royal Red Cross ==
=== Associate of the Royal Red Cross (ARRC) ===
Royal Australian Air Force

- Squadron Leader Patricia Ann Furbank.

== Air Force Cross ==
Royal Australian Navy

- Lieutenant Barry John Evans.

Royal Australian Air Force

- Flight Lieutenant Allan Grant Houston.
- Wing Commander Ronald Richard Tayles.
- Flight Lieutenant John Jeffrey Wilkinson.

== Air Force Medal ==
Royal Australian Air Force

- Corporal David Alexander Roman.
- Sergeant David Keith Russell.

== Queen's Commendation for Valuable Service in the Air ==
Royal Australian Air Force

- Flight Lieutenant Robert Gordon Anderson.
- Squadron Leader Michael Anthony Lavercombe.
- Flight Lieutenant William David MacCubbin.
- Wing Commander Arthur John White.
