= Australian Polo Federation =

Australian governing body of polo

- Sport: Polo
- Jurisdiction: National
- Founded: 1924
- Affiliation: Federation of International Polo
- Headquarters: Australia
- Chairman: Mr Tim Clarke

Official website
- www.australianpolo.com.au
- (Australia)

The Australian Polo Federation (also known as Australian Polo Council) is the governing body for the sport of Polo in Australia.

== Overview ==
The Australian Polo Federation is the main governing body for the sport of polo in Australia. It is affiliated with the Federation of International Polo (FIP) and the Hurlingham Polo Association, as well as the Confederation of Australian Sport.

The federation comprises associations of all Australian states except for Tasmania and the Northern Territory.

The member associations are:

- New South Wales Polo Association
- Queensland Polo Association
- South Australian Polo Association
- Victorian Polo Association
- Western Australian Polo Association

== Australian Polo Hall of Fame ==
In 2012, the federation established the Australian Polo Hall of Fame. The inaugural inductees included the Ashton Brothers, John Sinclair-Hill , Robert Skene, Jim MacGinley, Peter Cudmore, Ken Telford and James Ashton.

== See also ==
- Australian Professional Rodeo Association
- Australian Racing Board
- Equestrian Australia
