= Mervyn Twynam Davis =

Australian landscape architect

Mervyn Twynam Davis MBE
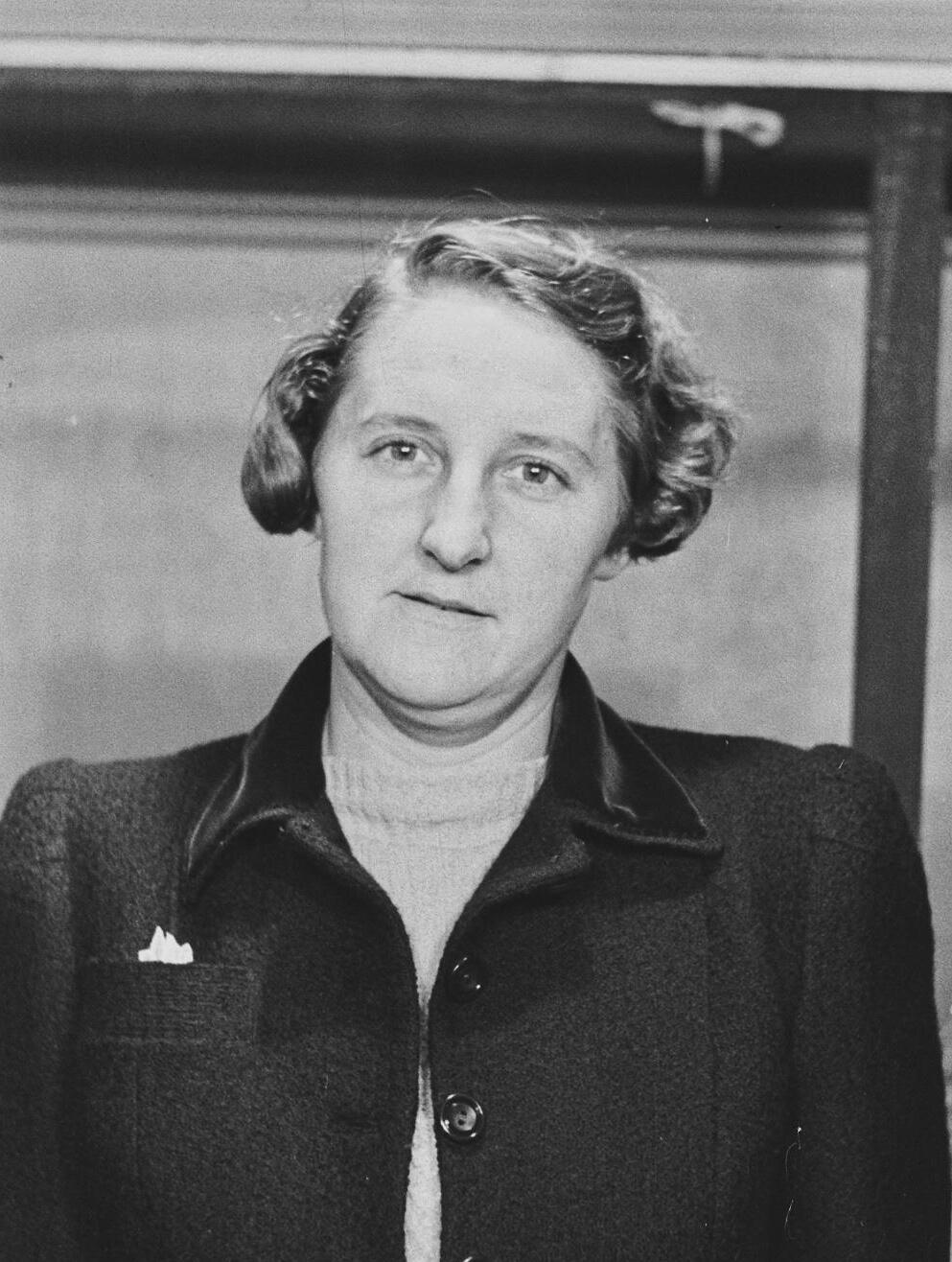
- 1942 enlistment photograph
- Born: 22 November 1916; St Kilda, Victoria, Australia
- Died: 20 April 1985 (aged 68); Melbourne, Victoria, Australia
- Known for: Landscape design, botanical collecting

Mervyn Twynam Davis (22 November 1916 – 20 April 1985) was an Australian servicewoman, botanical collector and landscape architect. She was instrumental in the formation of the Australian Institute of Landscape Architects and its first fellow.

== Life and career ==
Mervyn Twynam Davis was born in the Melbourne suburb of St Kilda, Victoria on 22 November 1916. Her parents were Ida (née Bell) and Frank Dawson Davis. She was educated at Firbank Grammar School.

Davis was working in Hobart as a librarian when she enlisted in the Women's Auxiliary Australian Air Force in 1942. She served within Australia as a transport driver. Following her discharge, she attended Burnley Horticultural College, where she studied horticulture and graduated in 1946 as dux.

She worked in Melbourne as a laboratory assistant at a flour mill, while designing and planting gardens on the weekends. She moved to South Australia in 1949 to join the Adelaide Botanic Garden as assistant to its director, Noel Lothian. After returning to the Melbourne Botanic Garden in 1951, her interest in garden design increased and by 1955 she had completed a number of private commissions.

In 1956, Davis went to England to take a course in landscape architecture at Durham University. The following year she took up a three-month fellowship at the International Agricultural Study Centre at Wageningen University in the Netherlands.

Back in Melbourne, she served as landscape design consultant to several architectural and engineering companies on commissions including Monash University and Perth Airport (1959–1963). This led her in 1964 to a technical officer role with the Commonwealth Department of Works, taking on design projects across Australia and in Papua New Guinea. She later worked as a senior technical officer at the Federal Department of Housing and Construction until her retirement in 1980.

=== Botanical collecting ===
In 1954, Davis and her friend, Ray Gabriel (née Batt), flew from Hobart for a holiday with Deny and Margaret King, at Melaleuca in the South-West Wilderness region of Tasmania. Instead, they spent 11 days collecting 200 plant specimens, with Deny's assistance. The specimens were studied by Winifred Curtis at the University of Tasmania before being shipped to the Melbourne Herbarium.

She also collected specimens along the Victorian south coast between Torquay and Cape Otway, as well as in rural Tasmania and Flinders Island.

=== Collectors and Illustrators project ===
While working at the Melbourne Botanic Gardens, she began research on Australian Plants: Collectors and Illustrators 1780s–1980s. Her co-authors were James Hamlyn Willis, Daphne Pearson and John William Green. The work was published by the Western Australian Herbarium in 1986 and formed the basis of the Collectors and Illustrators section of the Council of Heads of Australian Herbaria website.

== Awards and recognition ==
In 1964, Davis was the first woman to be elected a Fellow of the Royal Australian Institute of Parks and Recreation. In 1969, she was the first person to be elected a Fellow of the Australian Institute of Landscape Architects.

She was appointed a Member of the Order of the British Empire for her public service in the 1980 Queen's Birthday Honours.

== Death and legacy ==
Davis died in Melbourne on 20 April 1985. Her remains were cremated and scattered at Springvale Botanical Cemetery.

In 1985, the library at the Canberra College of Advanced Education (now University of Canberra) received a donation of her slides and manuscripts relating to landscape architecture. The State Library of Victoria holds a collection of 44 of her landscape designs, covering both private and public commissions, including Monash University and Perth Airport.
