= Wiltja =

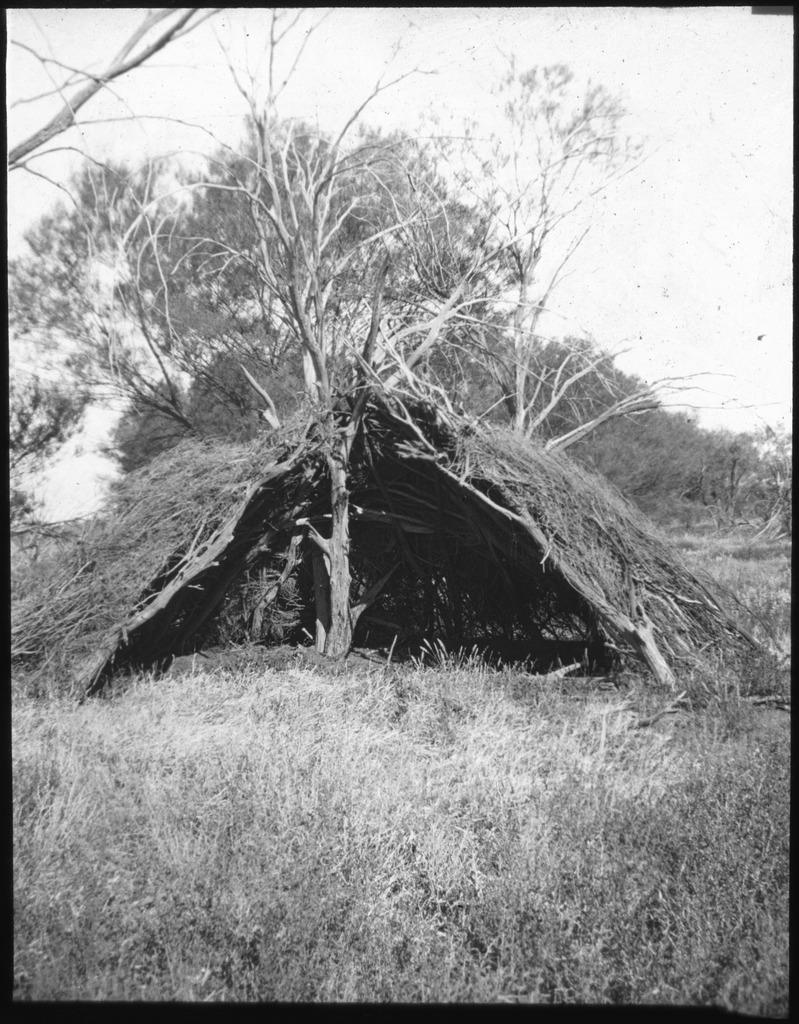
Wiltja in outback, circa 1940

Wiltjas are shelters made by the Pitjantjatjara, Yankunytjatjara and other Aboriginal Australian peoples. Also known as Wurleys, they are temporary dwellings, and are abandoned and rebuilt rather than maintained. Open and semi-circular, wiltjas are meant primarily as a defence against the heat of the sun, and are not an effective shelter from rain.

== See also ==
- Humpy

== Photographs ==
- Aboriginal people outside a wiltja shelter made of bark and branches c.1914 - State Library of Victoria
- Aboriginal bough shelter known as a “wiltja”, at Desert Tracks Pitjantjatjara Tours camp - Alamy
