= Derek Roff (park ranger) =

Australian head park ranger (1930–2016)

Arthur Derek Roff, known formally as Derek Roff, (8 October 1930 – 10 August 2016) was the former head ranger at Uluṟu-Kata Tjuṯa National Park, then known at Ayers Rock National Park, who managed it between 1968 and 1985 during a time of political and social upheaval. He was managing the park during the events of the death of Azaria Chamberlain in 1980 and the subsequent inquests and trials.

== Life in the Northern Territory ==
Roff began working at the National Park in 1968 and, both before and after the death of Azaria Chamberlain, he spoke about the dangers of an increasing amount of dingoes in the area and requested a cull be carried out; two weeks before Azaria's disappearance requested ammunition to shoot the dingoes. He reported numerous incidents of dingoes attacking children including children being attacked with blood being drawn and posted notices around the campground warning campers against feeding the dingoes and urging caution.

He was a vocal advocate for Lindy Chamberlain-Creighton in stating that he saw dingo tracks leading from the Chamberlains' tent on the night that Azaria was taken and that it was possible a dingo did take her.

Roff was appointed a Member of the Order of the British Empire (MBE) in the 1980 Queen's Birthday Honours in recognition of his service to wildlife conservation.

Roff left his role at the National Park following the hand-back of Uluru to the Aṉangu Traditional Owners in October 1985 under the Aboriginal Land Rights (Northern Territory) Act.

== Select publications ==
- Roff, Derek & Northern Territory Reserves Board (1976). Mammals of the Ayers Rock - Mt. Olga National Park. Northern Territory Reserves Board, [Alice Springs, NT].
- Roff, Derek (1979). Ayer's Rock & the Olgas. Ura Smith, Sydney.
- Roff, Derek & Woerle, Frank, 1931-, (author.) (1995). Still the Territory. Barker Souvenirs, Alice Springs, NT.
- Roff, Derek & Williams, Kerry & Thompson, R. B (1996). Uluru-Kata Tjuta National Park. Barker Souvenirs, Alice Springs, NT.
