= Perth Polo Club =

Polo club in Perth, Western Australia

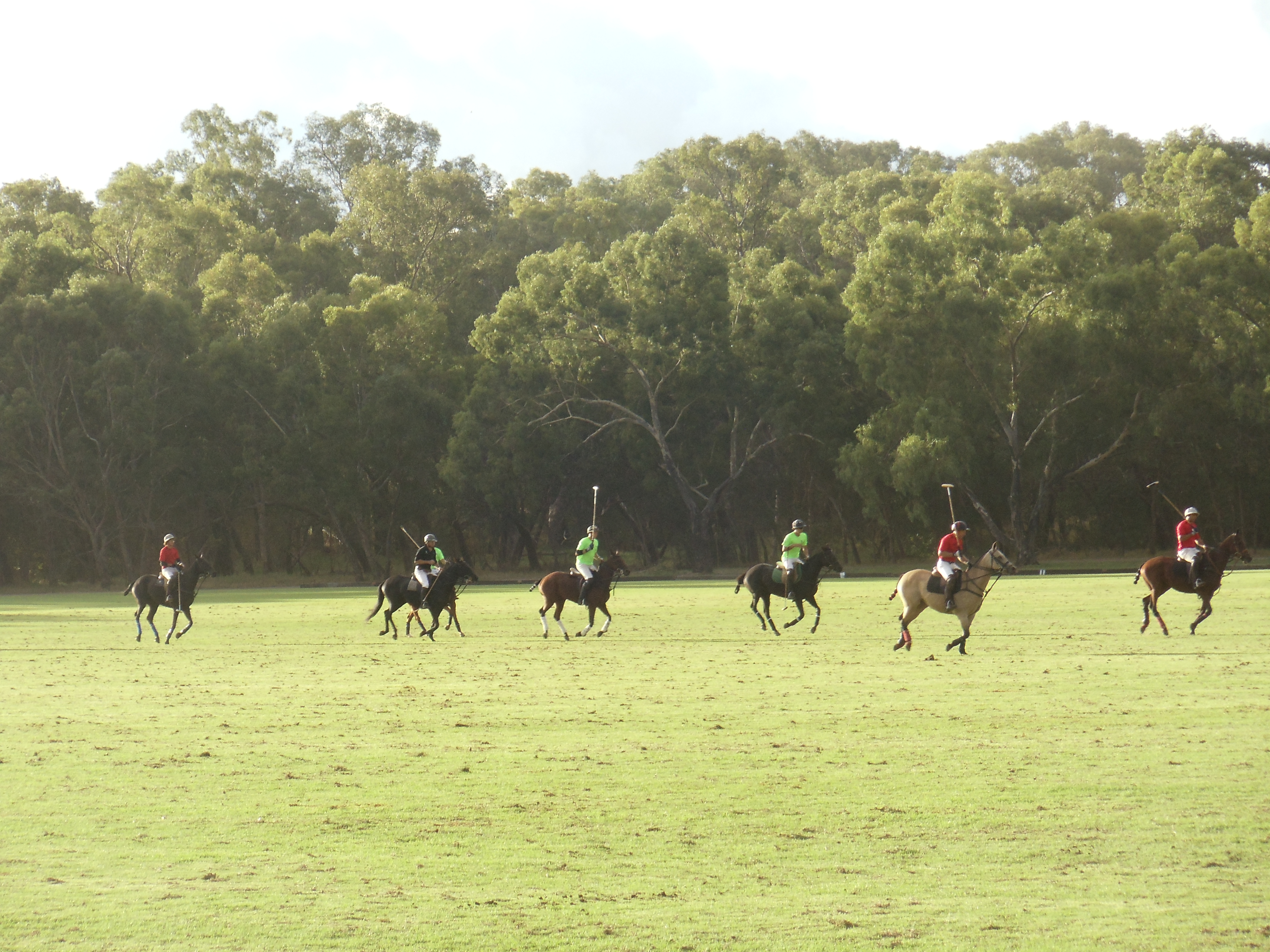
Polo players at the 2014 W.A. Open Polo Championship on 30 March 2014.

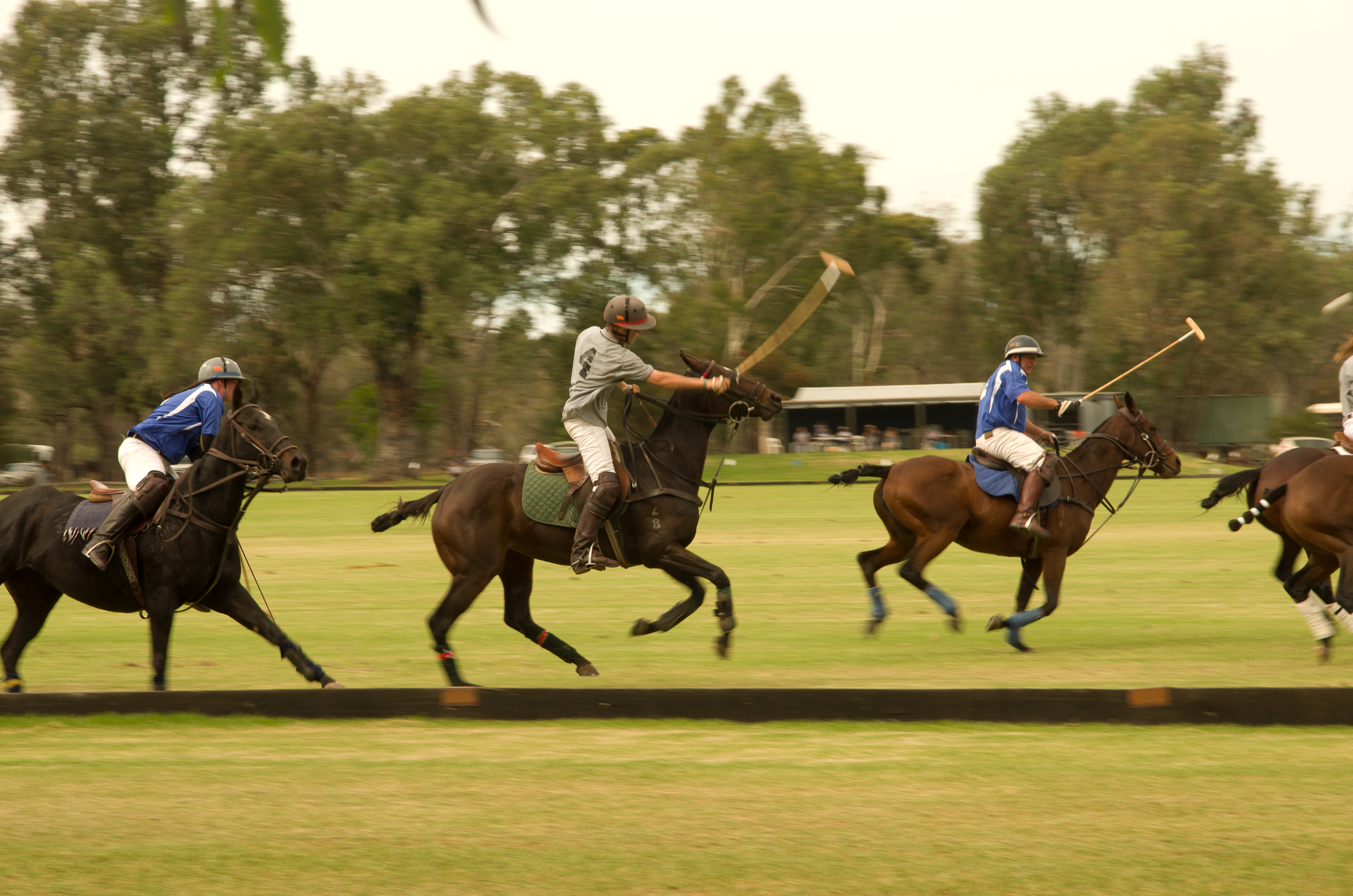
Polo players in April 2015

The Perth Polo Club is a polo club in Guildford, a suburb of Perth, Western Australia.

== Location ==
The club is currently located at Kings Meadow on the outer southern side of the historical town of Guildford, on the river flat of the Helena River.

Former grounds include Claremont Showground, and other locations over time.

== History ==
The club was founded in 1896 and is the oldest polo club in Western Australia. It was set up before the establishment of the Western Australian Polo Association in 1903. The club's founder, Neil McNeil, was a railway contractor, timber merchant and landowner who resided at The Cliffe in Peppermint Grove. On 17 September 1896, members of the club met at the United Service Hotel for races to be held on 10 October of the same year.

In its early days, the club was patronized by Gerard Smith, who served as the governor of Western Australia from 1895 to 1900. Michael O'Connor, who served as a member of the Western Australian Legislative Assembly from 1901 to 1904, also held office as the club's Captain.

In 1902, McNeil was the President, while the Vice Presidents were Edward Wittenoom and T. W. Brown. Committee members were Everard Darlot, D. B. Ord, P. Law Smith, N. D'Arcy and Dr O'Connor. A year later, in 1903, the club held a ball at the Mechanics' Institute. In 1930, a ball held by the club was attended by William Campion, who served as the governor of Western Australia from 1924 to 1931.

After World War II, with activity and membership in decline, W.G. Bennett revived the club. Together with Stewart Harkness, he also made the decision to move the club from the Claremont Showground in Claremont to Kings Meadow in Guildford.

As of 2014, the club president was Neville Stewart.
