= Australian Professional Rodeo Association =

Sports governing body in Australia

- Sport: Rodeo
- Founded: 1944
- Country: Australia
- Most recent champions: (Australia) Campbell Hodson, All-Round Cowboy (Australia) Elyssa Kenny, All-Round Cowgirl
- Website: prorodeo.com.au

The Australian Professional Rodeo Association (APRA) is the national governing body for professional rodeo in Australia. Founded in 1944, APRA has been setting the standards for rodeo in Australia for over 80 years. The Australian rodeo consists of several events which include bareback bronc riding, breakaway roping, steer wrestling, team roping, saddle bronc riding, rope and tie, barrel racing and bull riding. Men, women and children are involved in the Australian rodeo circuit.

== National Finals Rodeo ==
The premier event for Australian Rodeo is the Australia National Finals Rodeo. It was first held in 1960 in Queensland.

== Controversy over animal welfare ==
Controversy currently surrounds the rodeo industry in Australia. As the APRA is a self-regulating body, concerns have been raised by animal welfare groups and the Australian Veterinary Association regarding the ethical treatment of animals used in rodeo events. These concerns include the lack of animal welfare policing at events and the non-mandatory attendance of veterinary professionals. Cattle prods and shocking devices have been seen to be used gratuitously despite this practice being in opposition to the APRA code.

Rodeo events are banned in the Australian Capital Territory.

== See also ==
- Australian Polo Federation
- Australian Racing Board
- Equestrian Australia
