= Buckjumping =

Buckjumping is the traditional term in Australia for the sport and skill of riding a horse who is determined to be free of such encumbrance. Unbroken horses with a strong instinct to resist being ridden are cherished, and the wildest of them are prized as "outlaws".

== History ==
Buck-jumping by a horse is the act of leaping with head down, back arched and legs drawn together, and has been linked to the practice of hobbling, which deprives the horse of the rearing tactic as a means of emptying the saddle. Buckjumping as a sport is often the highlight of a rodeo or campdraft, as such exhibitions of bush horsemanship are sometimes called.

The challenge for the rider is to stay with the horse for ten seconds. The rules stipulate that the rider holds the halter rope with one hand only, while the other hand is held away from, and above, the saddle. Even touching one's hat can disqualify the rider.

Buckjumpers describe three techniques used by a cunning horse:

- Crow hopping is the action where the horse leaps into the air, four feet at once. This is the easiest for a skilled rider who only has to avoid being launched into the air.
- Sun fishing is when the horse rears up on his hind legs so the sun shines on his belly, and can do terrible damage to a rider if he falls back.
- Side rolling is the hardest on the rider, and only the nimblest escape injury.

When thrown from the horse, the safest defence is usually to lie perfectly still: you then have only one chance in ten of serious injury, but attempting to roll away can lead to disaster. It is said that sometimes a rider deliberately allows themself to be thrown, to encourage the horse to greater efforts in future.
