= Humpy =

Temporary shelter traditionally used by Australian Aboriginals

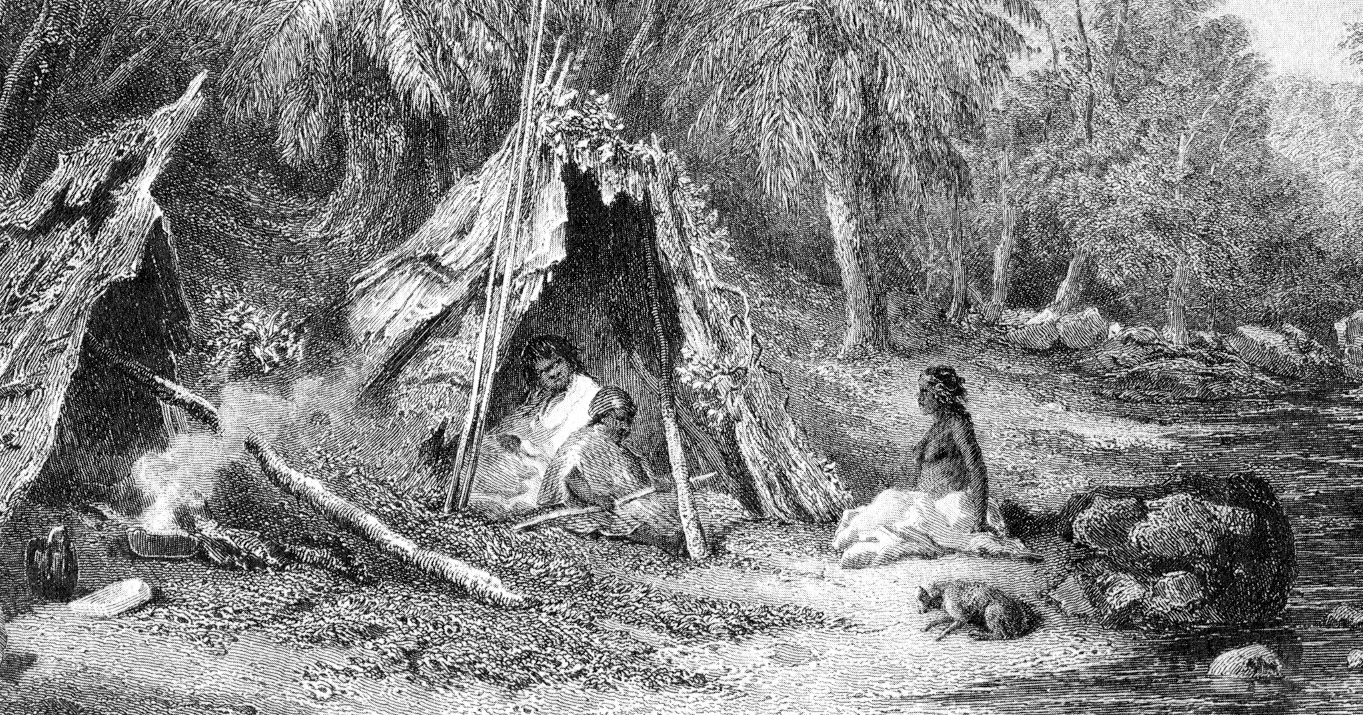
A 19th-century engraving showing Aboriginal people and a humpy

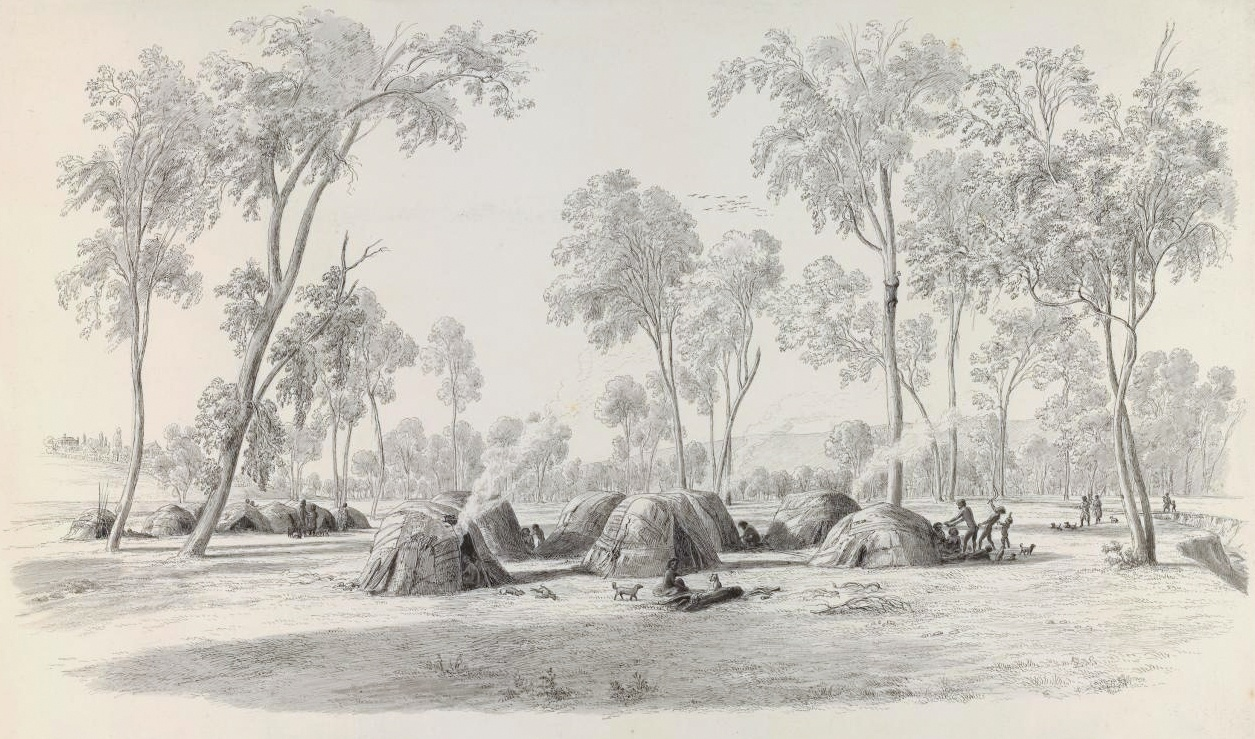
Aboriginal winter encampments in wurlies, South Australia, c. 1858

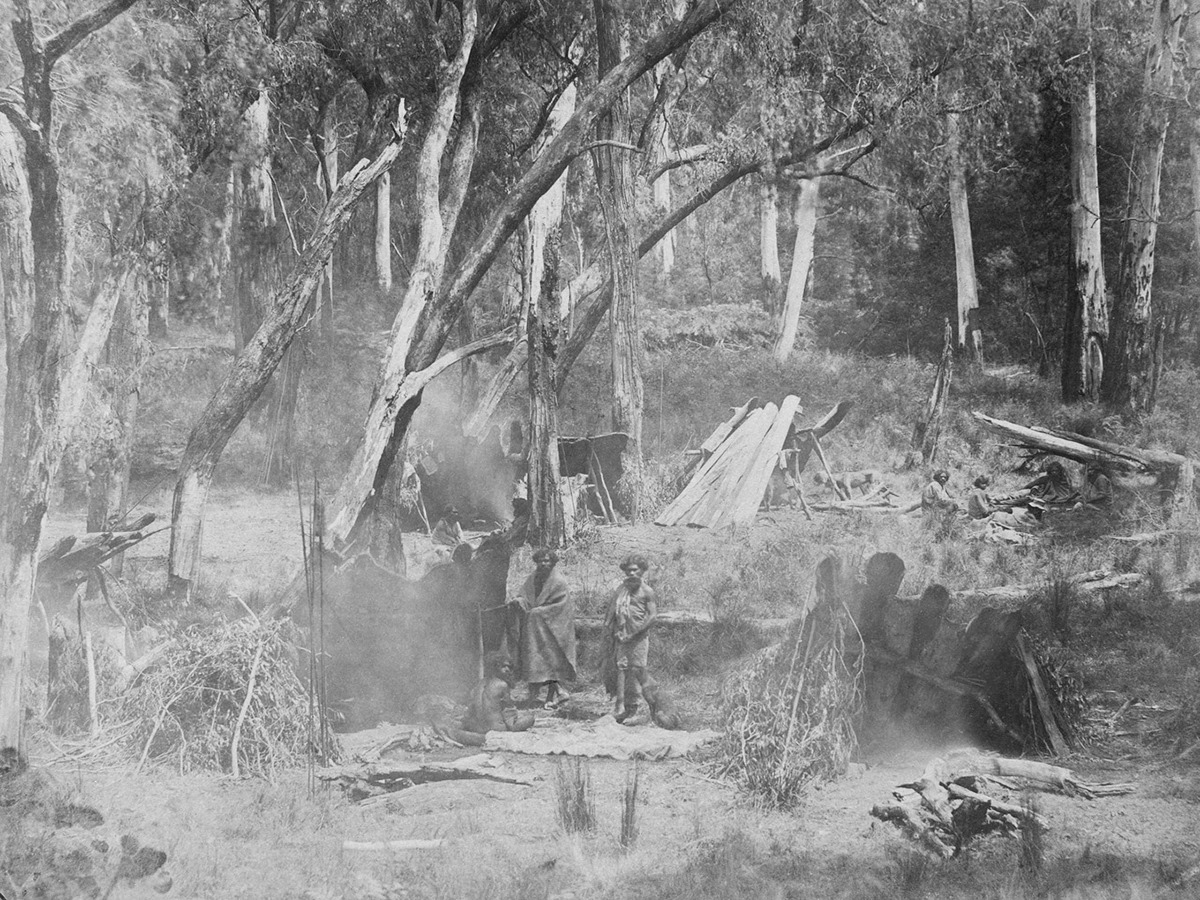
Aboriginal camp, Victoria, c. 1858

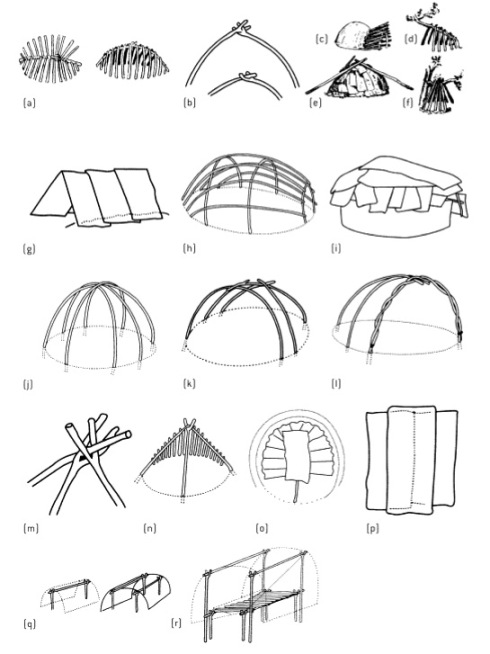
Different types of Aboriginal shelters, Queensland.

A humpy, also known as a gunyah, wurley, wurly, wurlie, mia-mia, or wiltja, is a small, temporary shelter, traditionally used by Australian Aboriginal people. These impermanent dwellings, made of branches and bark, are sometimes called a lean-to, since they often rely on a standing tree for support.

== Etymology ==
The word humpy comes from the Turrubal language (a Murri people from now-inner Brisbane, e.g. Coorparoo, Nundah). Other languages had different names for the structure. In South Australia, such a shelter is known as a "wurley" (also spelled "wurlie"), possibly from the Kaurna language. They are called wiltjas in Pitjantjatjara and Yankunytjatjara languages; mia-mia in Wadawurrung language around Melbourne.

== Usage ==
They were temporary shelters made of bark, branches, leaves and grass used by Indigenous Australians. Both names were adopted by early white settlers, and now form part of the Australian lexicon. The use of the term appears to have broadened in later usage to include any temporary building made from any available materials, including canvas, flattened metal drums, and sheets of corrugated iron.

In Dark Emu, Bruce Pascoe argues that contrary to popular perception of Aboriginal dwellings being only temporary, some gunyahs in the Channel Country could accommodate up to 50 people and formed part of permanent agricultural communities.

== Gallery ==
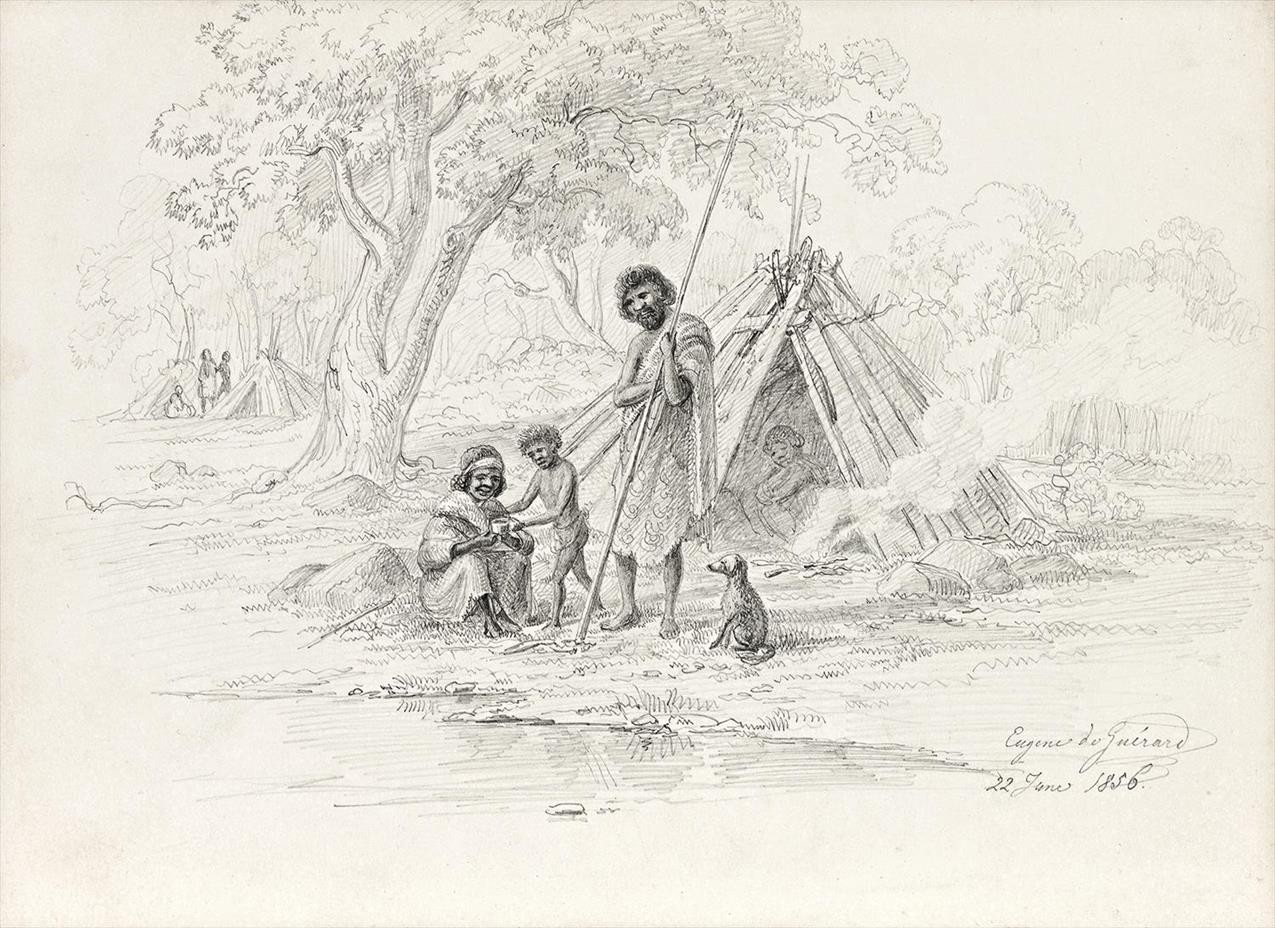
Aboriginal family and their temporary bark gunya (shelter), c. 1856

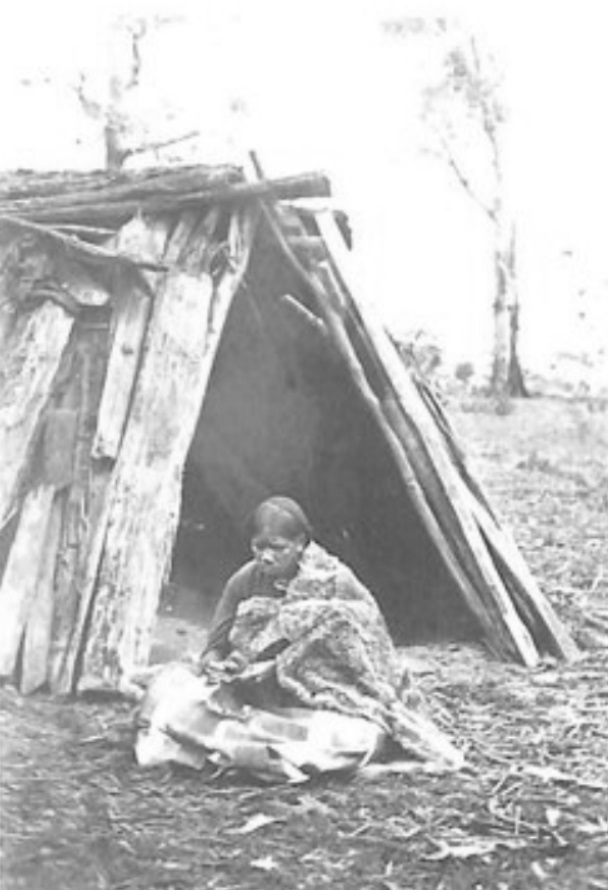
Aboriginal woman in front of bark gunya (shelter), Victoria, c. 1872

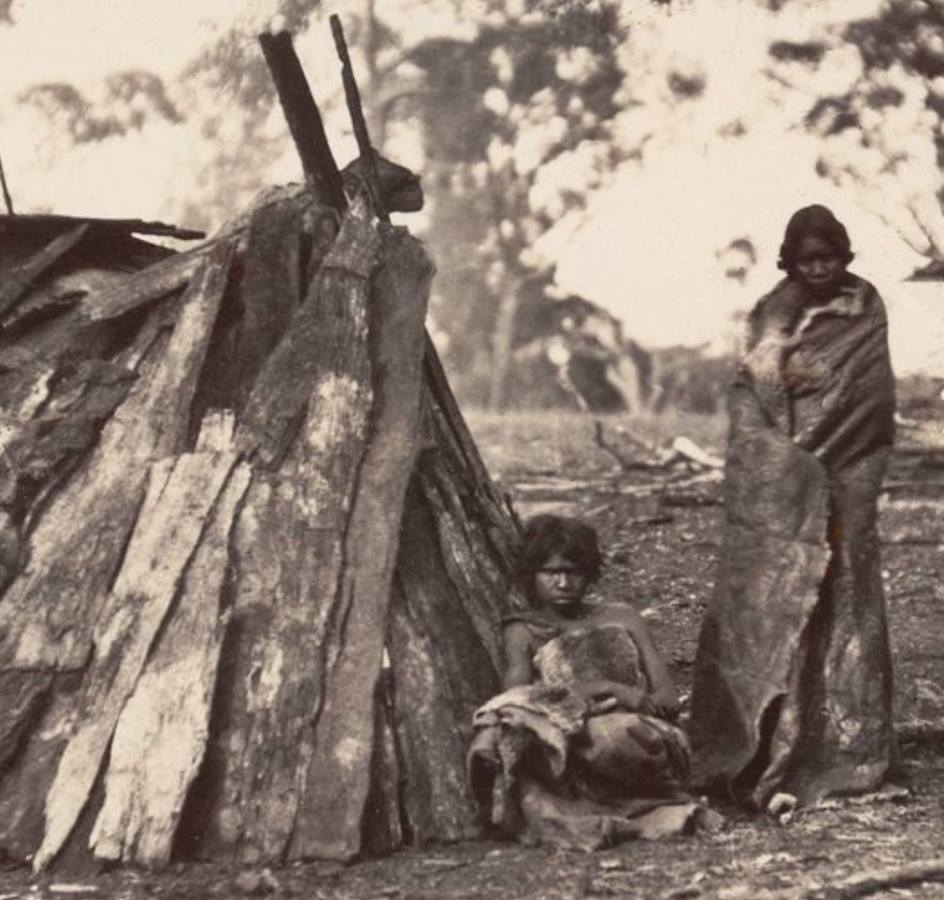
Two Aboriginal woman in front of bark gunya, c. 1850s

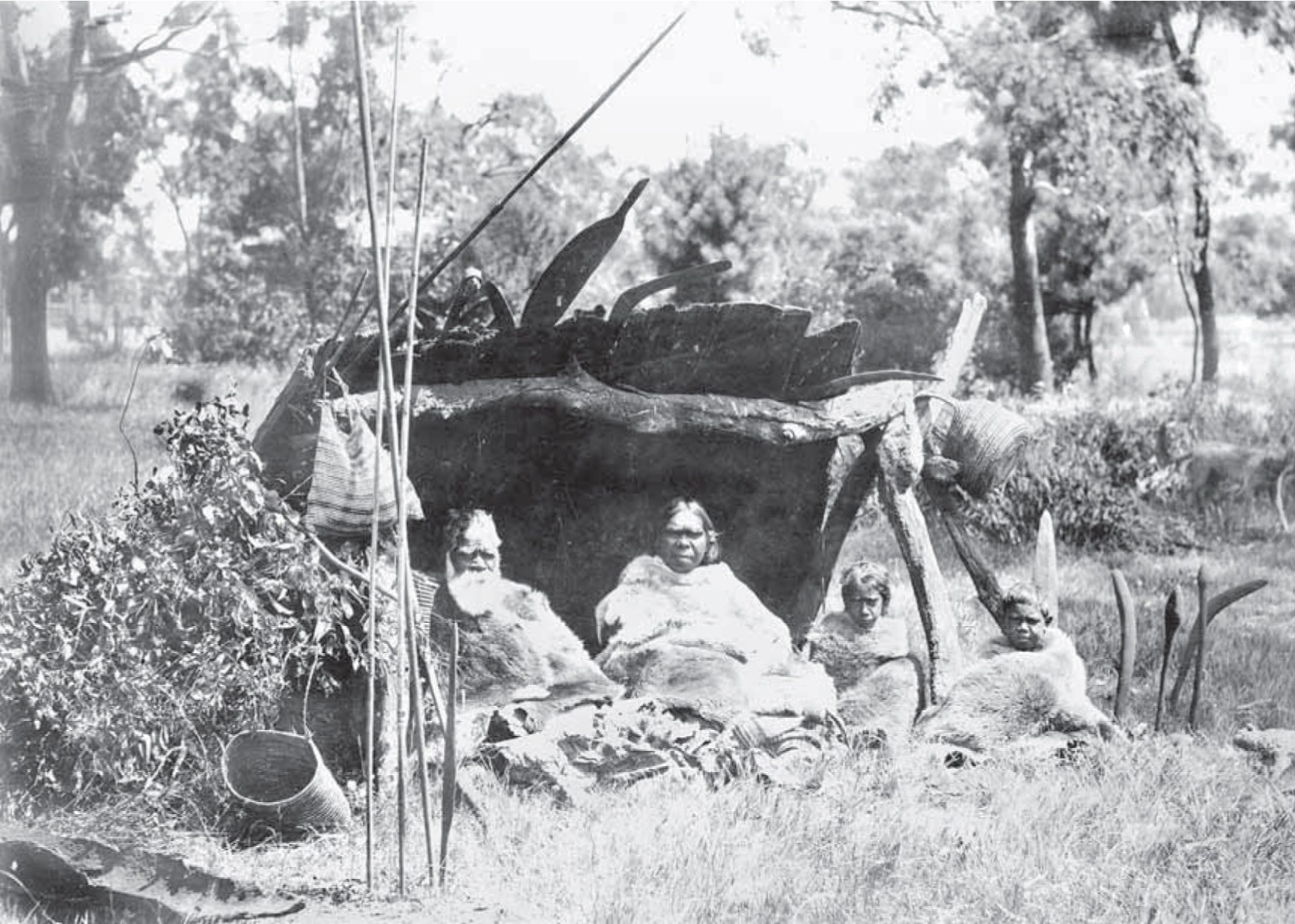
Temporary lean-to bark gunyah, c. 1888

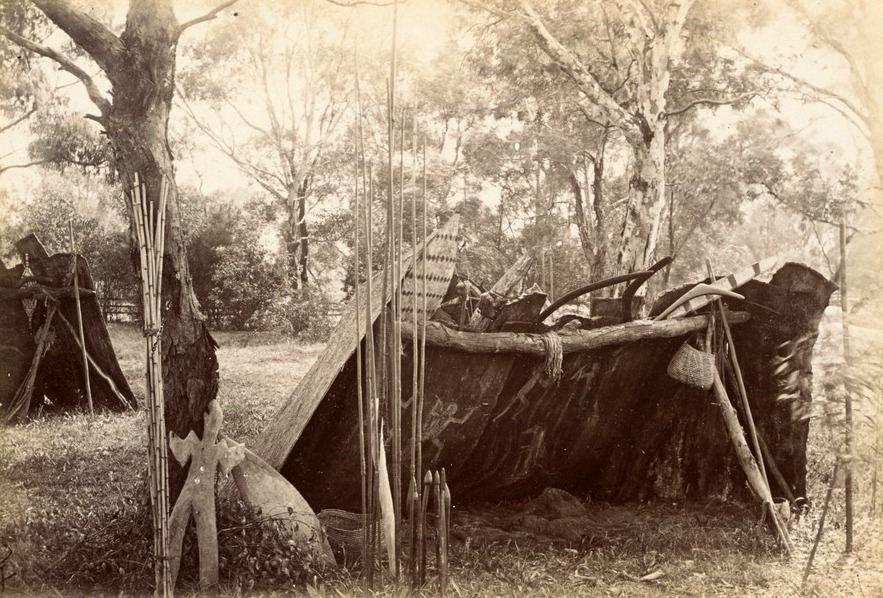
Temporary lean-to bark gunyah, 1889

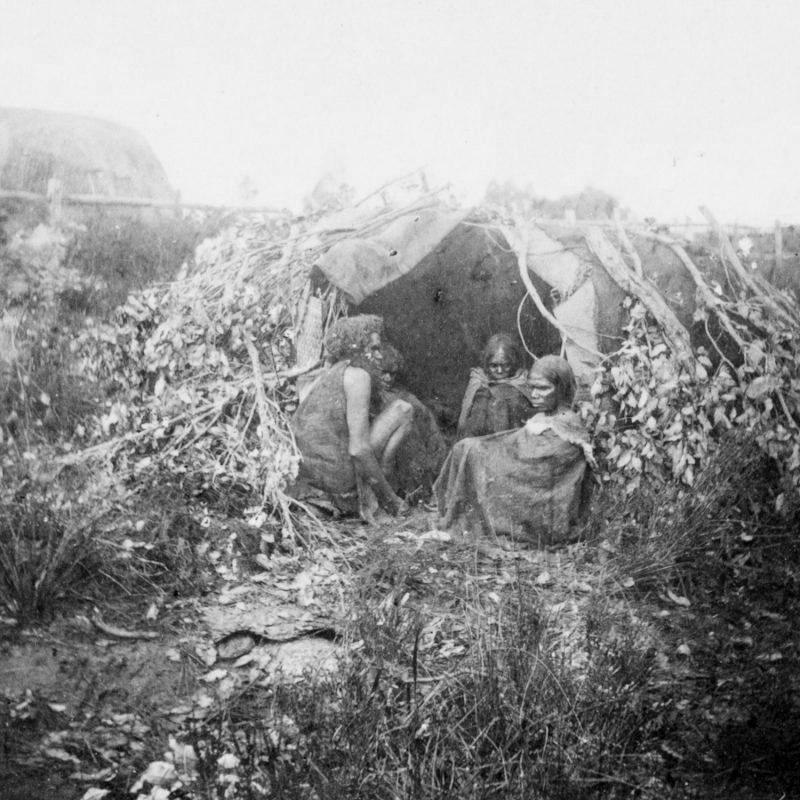
Aboriginal people at the entrance to their dwelling, Western Australia, c. 1876

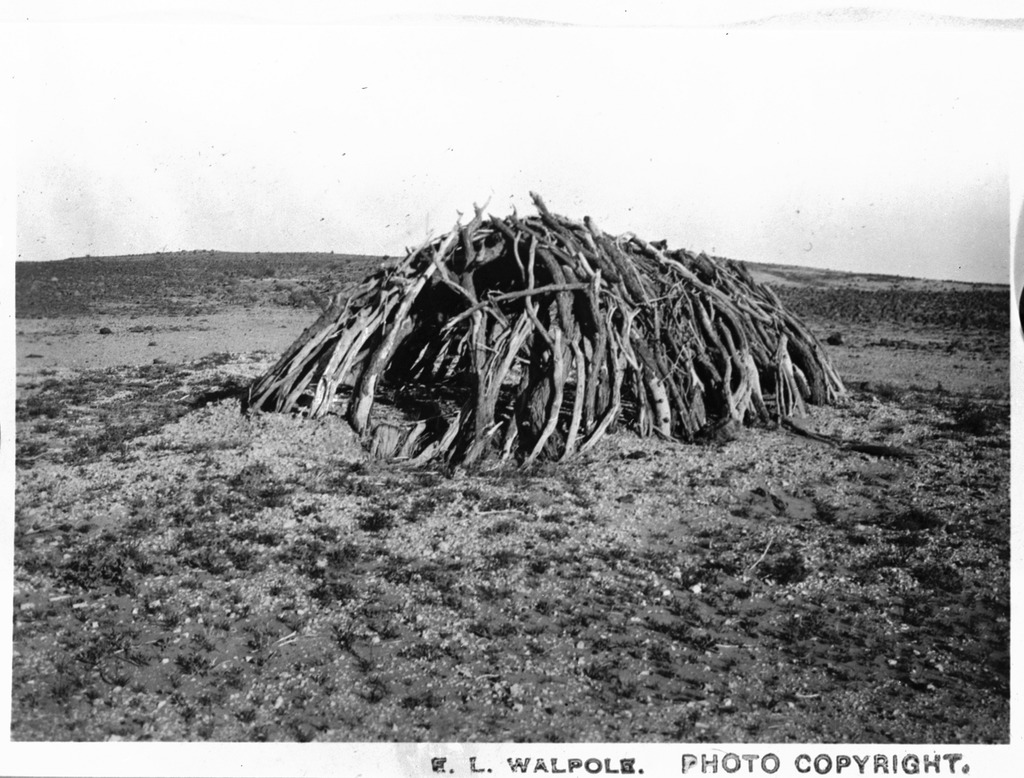
Framework of a humpy in far western Queensland, 1937

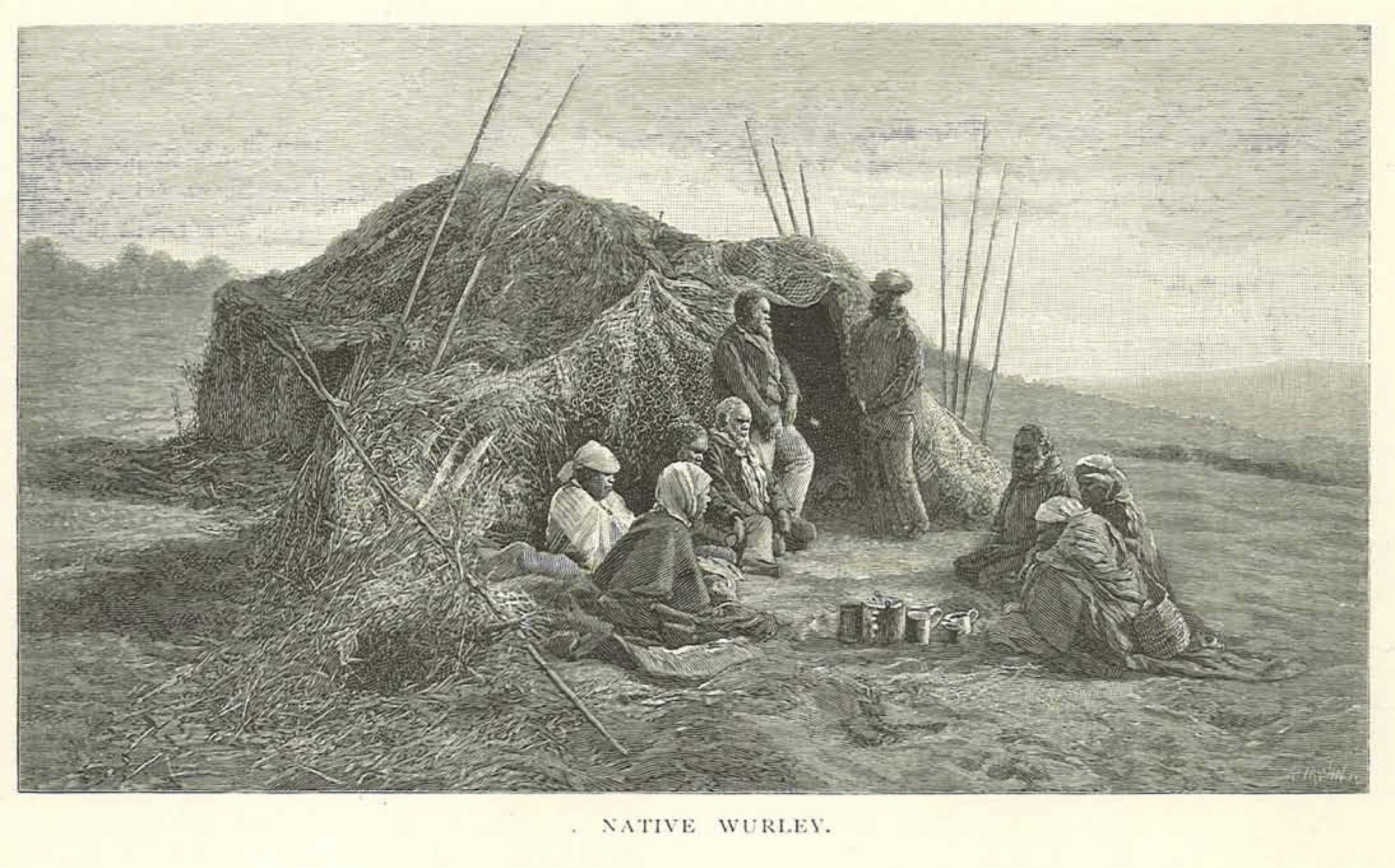
Native Wurley, 1886

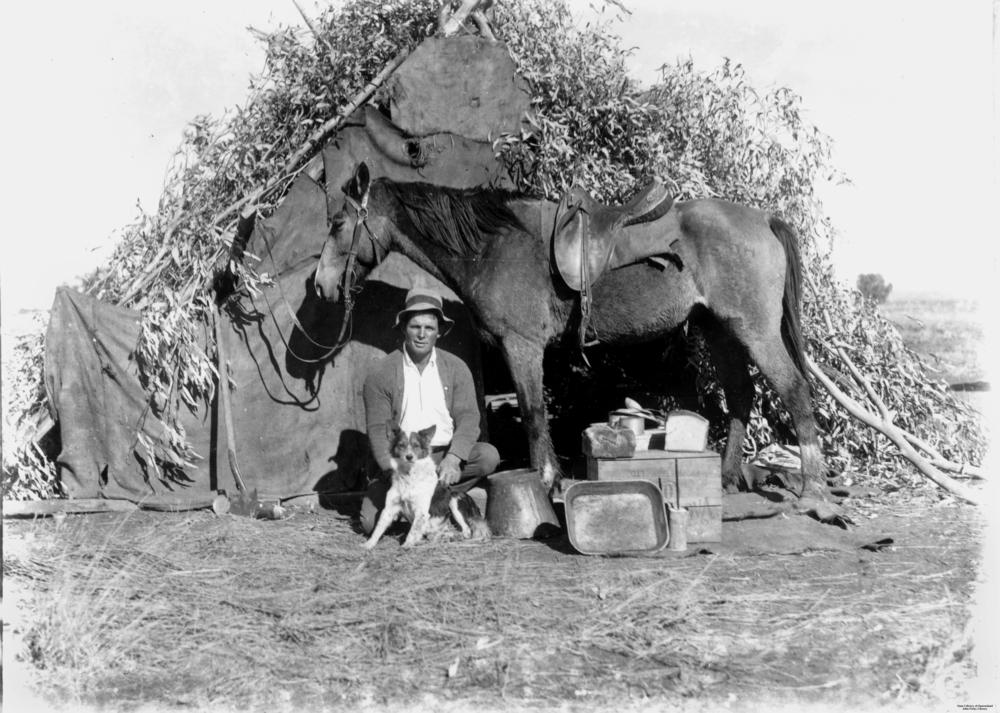
Bushman humpy, 1910s

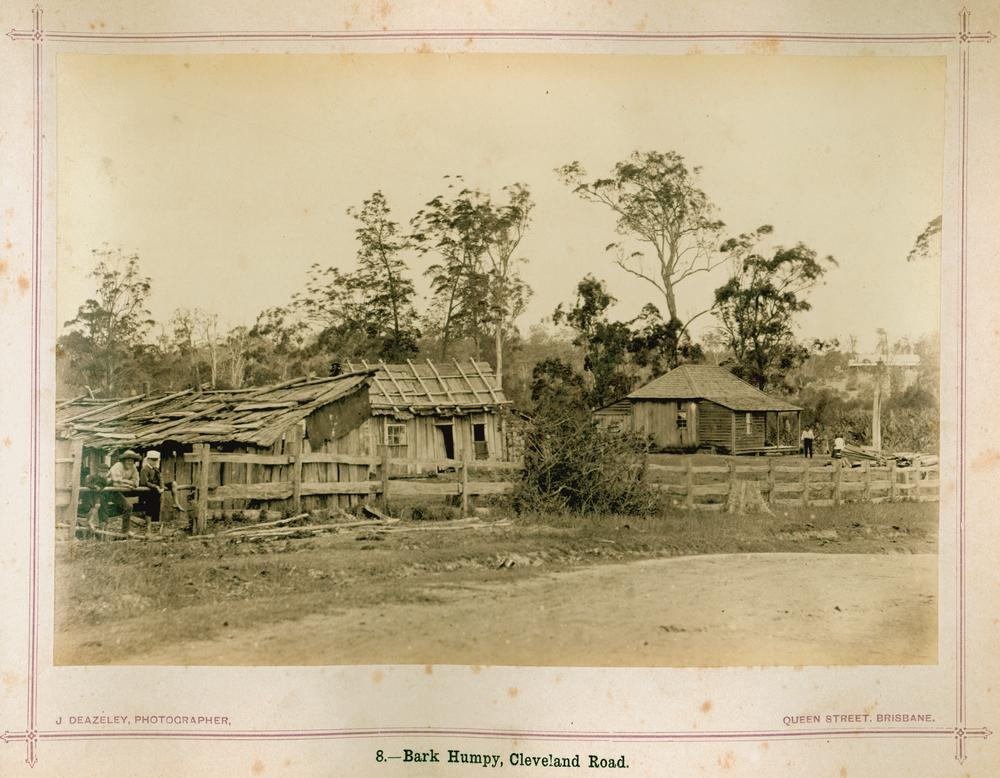
Bark humpy, Brisbane, 1874

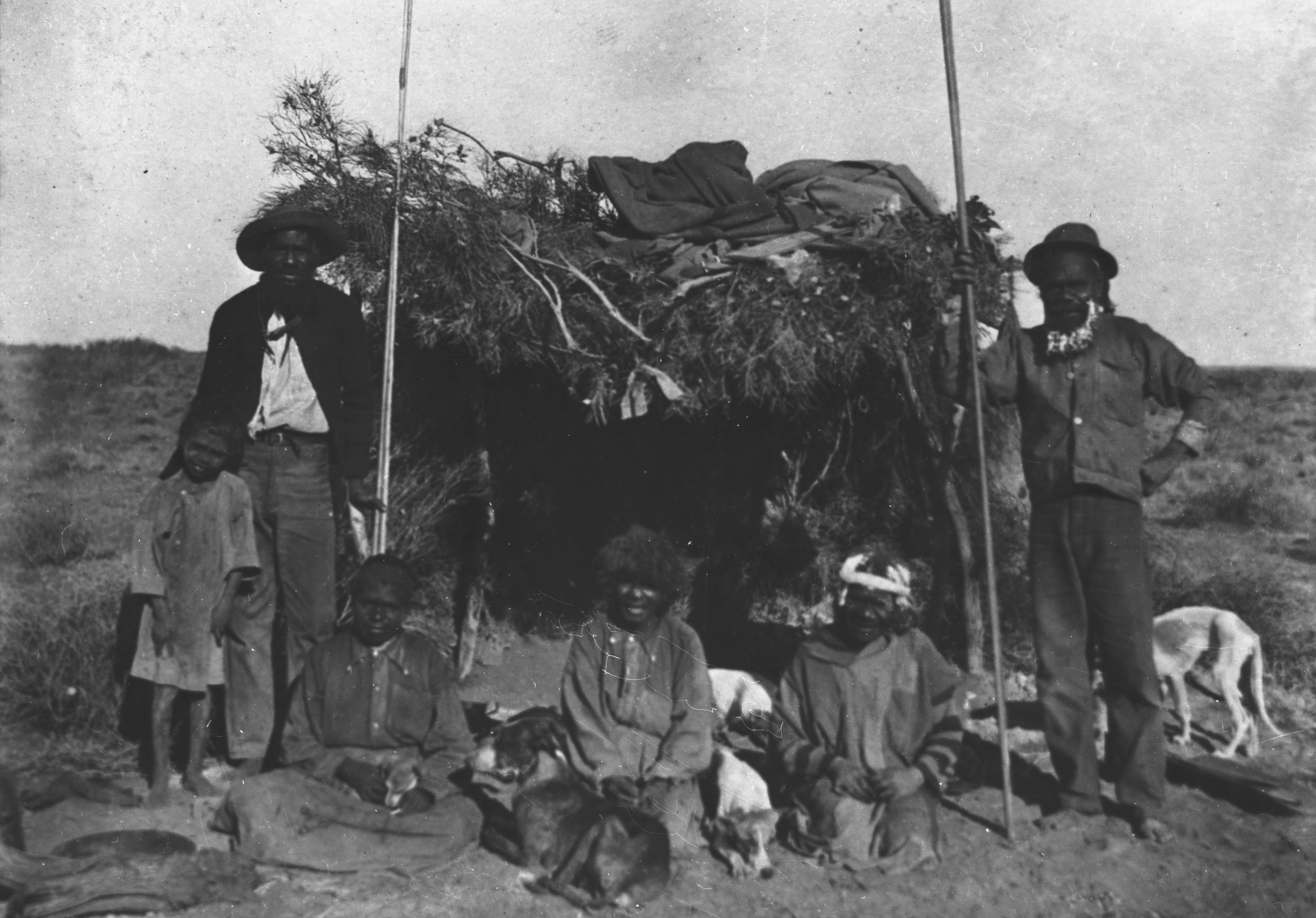
[Aboriginal people] and wurlie near Alice Springs (Mparntwe), c. 1930s.

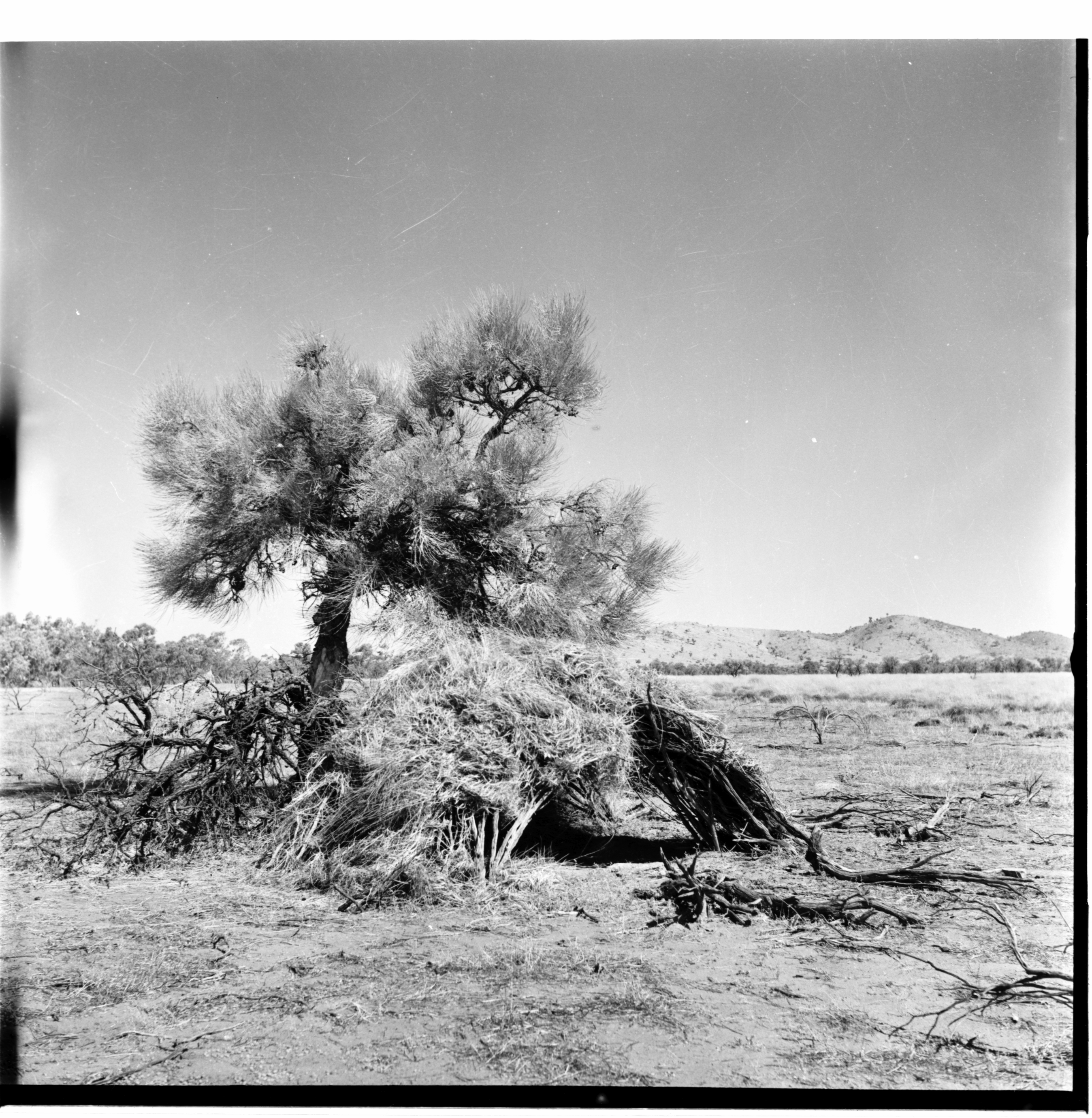
Aboriginal wurlie near Alice Springs, c. 1930s

== See also ==
- Wiltja
- Wigwam
- Goahti
