= Equestrian Australia =

National governing body for equestrian sports in Australia

- Sport: Equestrian
- Jurisdiction: Australia
- Abbreviation: EA
- Founded: 1951
- Affiliation: FEI
- Affiliation date: 1951
- Headquarters: Homebush, New South Wales
- Location: NSW, Australia

Official website
- www.equestrian.org.au
- (Australia)

Equestrian Australia (EA) is the national governing body for equestrian sports in Australia. These sports include the FEI-recognized disciplines of dressage, eventing, show jumping, equestrian vaulting, endurance riding, reining, para-equestrian, and combined driving. EA also develops and enforces the rules for other events at horse shows.

== History ==
The body was founded in 1951 as the Equestrian Federation of Australia and was formally affiliated with the International Federation for Equestrian Sports in May of that year. On 14 November 2008, the Equestrian Federation of Australia changed its name to Equestrian Australia Limited, with the trading name of Equestrian Australia.

== See also ==
- Australian Polo Federation
- Australian Professional Rodeo Association
- Australian Racing Board
