= Sport in Chile =

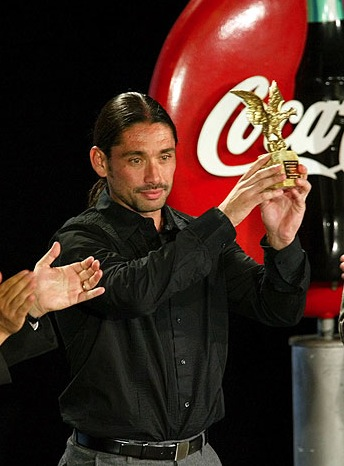
Marcelo Ríos was the first Latin American tennis player to be number one in the world, after defeating Andre Agassi in 1998. He was also honored by the General Directorate of Sports and Recreation as the Chilean sportsman of the 20th Century.

Sports in Chile are performed at both amateur and professional levels, practiced both at home and abroad to develop and improve, or simply represent the country. Association football is the most popular sport in Chile, and is played for a range of reasons. However, the country's most successful sport is tennis. In rural areas, Chilean rodeo is the most practiced sport in Chile, which is the national sport. Chile has achieved great international success in other sports, and there have been important figures, however, such exploits are not known to the general population because they are not sports that have been popular throughout the country.

The country has experience as host of major global sporting events such as the 1959 Basketball World Cup, 1962 FIFA World Cup, 1992 and 2015 World Polo Championships and multisport events: 1986 and 2014 South American Games and the 2023 Pan American Games.

== History ==
The first played sport in Chile was palín (similar to hockey), first practiced by the Mapuche before the discovery and conquest of the country. The game was later called Chueca by the Spanish conquerors.

Years later Europeans introduced other sports unknown in this country. Valparaíso is Chile's main port, and due to the emerging nitrate industry in the north, it became a crossroads for ships coming from Europe, bringing equipment and personnel for newspapers, firefighting, railroads, steam engines, and others. Immigrants from England, Italy and Spain came to work in the hills mining nitrate. They had traveled to Chile to stay and live, but the immigrants yearned for the customs of the old continent, especially the British. Chilean sport originated in the town of Valparaiso in the second half of the 19th century by the British and their descendants born in Chile, who began to ride horses, and then played cricket. In 1870, badminton and tennis courts had been built. Then rugby and football clubs were created with British names that continue to be used, as Wanderers and Everton are still present in the port and its neighboring city, Viña del Mar. Sport initially served as a demonstration of spirit and promoted the health of its followers, but later became an expression of entertainment that would gain spectators and fans.

The development of sport was unstable, with no planning by government and without large financial contributions, only the will of those interested. Chile participated among the select countries inaugurating the Modern Olympics in Athens, Greece, where there was no official representation, but a spontaneous presence of a single athlete, Luis Subercaseaux, who arrive dressed in the national colors to run the hundred meter dash, and had been training in outdoor running. After a hundred years of modern sport, the history of Chile has not produced many world level sports heroes, but by the end of the 20th century, it became clear that the competition was to win. The triumphs in the meantime have been less than many would like, but objectively, more than many would believe.

== Athletics ==
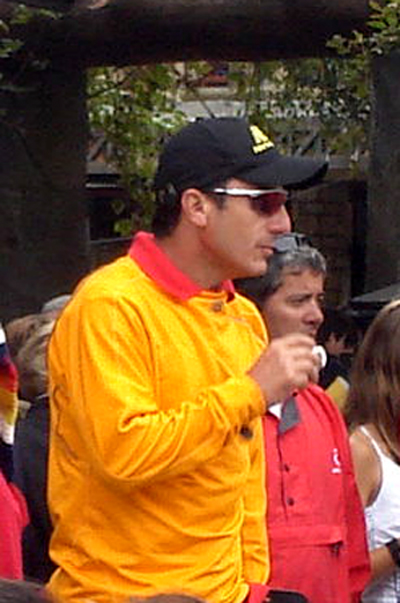
Cristián Bustos won second place at the 1992 Hawaii Ironman, and is the only top-ten Latin American in the triathlon.

The first Olympic medal that went to Chile was in athletics.

=== Track and field ===
Manuel Plaza Reyes ran 42.195 kilometers in 2 hours 33 minutes and 23 seconds to win a silver medal in the 1928 Olympic Games in Amsterdam. Marlene Ahrens won a silver medal in the javelin in the 1956 Olympic Games, the first and only woman representing Chile to win an Olympic medal. The athlete with the most recent win is sprinter Sebastián Keitel, who was considered at the time to be the fastest white man in the world in the 200 meter dash.

=== Triathlon ===
The prime example of triathlon was the Chile triathlete Cristián Bustos, who almost won the Ironman title in Hawaii in 1992. Bustos ran a hard race against the legendary American Mark Allen, and in the running phase, Bustos took the front position, but at 25 kilometers, Allen overtook him and Bustos took a close second place. Currently, the best female Chile participant is Barbara Riveros, who was ranked as the best triathlete in Latin America, and eighth in the world in the 2005 World Triathlon Championship. The best Chile male athlete in triathlon is Felipe Van de Wyngaard, who has made significant achievements nationally and abroad. Chile has Ironman 70.3 Pucón South American triathlon test circuits, Triathlon circuits, and Villarrica Viña del Mar, an international circuit with the most amateur and professional athletes in the world.

== Boxing ==
Boxing is accepted in Chile. Luis Vicentini and Estanislao Loayza (El Tani) are notable Chilean boxers from the 1920s. The greatest boxing figure of the 1930s was Arturo Godoy, who fought twice against Joe Louis, and was, until his retirement, South American champion in all weights. Ramón Tapia, Claudio Barrientos and Carlos Lucas were silver and bronze medalists in the 1956 Melbourne Olympic Games. Godfrey Stevens fought in 1970 for the world title against Japanese featherweight Shozo Saijyo. One of the most memorable fighters were flyweight Martín Vargas, who was South American champion in his specialty and tried four times to get the world boxing title for Chile, losing at every opportunity, but becoming a national idol. Carlos Cruzat was the world champion in the cross category in the International Boxing Association. In women's boxing, Patricia Demick was the world champion and became the first Chilean boxer, male or female, to hold a world title.

== Equestrian ==
Equestrian sports have achieved major successes for Chile. In 1949, Chile Army Captain Alberto Larraguibel with his horse "Huaso" succeeded in breaking the world record high jump to break a barrier of 2.47 meters.

In the 1952 Olympic Games, Chile's entire equestrian team participated in three disciplines: jumping, dressage, and concourse, receiving silver medals in team and individual show jumping. The pairs medalists were Ricardo Echeverría on "Lindo Peal" (Army), César Mendoza Durán on "Pillán" (Carabineros de Chile) and Óscar Cristi on "Bambi" (Carabineros). The latter won the silver medal in individual competition.

In 1981, the International Olympic Committee in New York awarded General Eduardo Yáñez Zavala distinction as "the best rider of all time" for his significant achievements in the 1930s and 1940s. Called "El maestro", he was the leading Chilean in countless equestrian competitions, president of the Equestrian Federation, and an International Olympic Judge.

== Fencing ==
Fencing is not well known in Chile. However, Chile has long had a fencing presence in the Olympic Games, the Pan American Games, and the South American Games with key competitors such as Paris Inostroza, who participated in three Olympic Games. Another outstanding athlete is Felipe Alvear, who has obtained several medals in the Pan American Games in the foil weapon.

== Golf ==
Golf is played in each of the major cities of central and southern Chile, and lately the game has spread considerably in popularity. However, this sport is practiced by the upper class and upper middle class due to high costs of participation in the game. The most important tournament played in the country is the Chile Open.

There are two benchmarks for this sport in Chile. Nicole Perrot is the greatest athlete of Chilean women's golf due to her outstanding participation in the LPGA tour, the main world women's golf circuit, winning the Longs Drugs tournament of 2005. The current leading male golfer in Chile is Joaquín Niemann.

== Gymnastics ==
Recently Chile has been very successful in gymnastics with Tomas Gonzalez Sepulveda, who was crowned world champion in several disciplines. In December 2010, Tomás González was awarded the "Condor of Gold" by the Circle of Sports Journalists of Chile as the best Chilean sportsman of the year.

== Martial arts ==
=== Karate ===
The most recent triumph for karate in Chile was by David Dubó, who became the world champion of Karate in Tokyo in 2008. Dubó won the final match in the category of 75 kilos, by a close margin in a fierce struggle against Turk Müslüm Baştürk that was decided by arbitrary decision.

=== Taekwondo ===
In 1988, the Chilean Taekwondo Federation became Interstyle Champion in martial arts, an event with over one thousand martial arts participants. Today, taekwondo in Chile is part of the Sports Federation, affiliated with the Chile Olympic Committee. Chile has participated in major events, like the ODESUR Games, where Chilean Taekwondo has added to date ten gold medals, earned by athletes Leopoldo Araneda, Fernando Remedy, Esteban Vitagliano and Renzo Zenteno in 1986; Diego Yánez and Humberto Norambuena in 1990; Anyelina Contreras, Sergio Cárdenas and Felipe Soto in 1994; Felipe Soto in 1998, and several silver and bronze medals.

In the Pan American Games, Chilean athlete Diego Yánez won a bronze medal in 1991, and Sergio Cárdenas also won bronze in 1995.

Three Chilean representatives have qualified and participated in the Olympic Games: Diego Yánez and Humberto Norambuena in Barcelona 1992 (when taekwondo was a demonstration sport), and Felipe Soto in Sydney 2000 (as an official sport). Chilean athletes have won a great number of medals in Taekwondo, and in the World Cup, the South American Championships, the Pan American Games and the World Games.

== Racing sports ==
=== Cycling ===
Cycling is one of the most practiced recreational sports in Chile, although Chilean cyclists have not had many competitive successes at the international level. The Vuelta Ciclista de Chile is the principal national competition in which various international teams participate.

Chilean cyclist Marco Arriagada has participated in three Olympic Games (1996, 2004 and 2008). He was the standard bearer in the Chilean delegation in the 2007 Pan American Games, where he won Gold in team pursuit and won fourth in scoring. Arriagada also received two gold medals and two silver medals in the 2003 Pan American Games; Gold in the 2006 South American Games; eight gold medals in Pan American Championships; two-time champion of the Tour of Chile; and champion of the 2004 World Cup in Russia. As for women, the most prominent international athlete is Bernardita Pizarro, who in 2006 was fifth in the Union Cycliste Internationale rankings.

In addition to Marco Arriagada, a number of other cyclists have excelled internationally. Usually the best riders in Chile are from the city of Curicó, which is known as the "capital of cycling".

=== Horse racing ===
Horse racing in Chile has been well developed since the end of the 19th century. Major racetracks include the Club Hípico de Santiago, the Hipódromo Chile and the Valparaíso Sporting Club. The major races held in Chile are the El Ensayo Classic, the St. Legar Classic and the Chile Derby, which make up the Triple Crown of horse racing in Chile.

Notable riders include Sergio Vásquez, with the most career wins in national horse racing; José Santos León, who rode in the United States for over 20 years and won more than 4,000 races; Carlos Pezoa, two-time winner in the Carlos Pellegrini International Gran Prix, the ultimate test in South American horse racing; Ruperto Donoso winner of the Belmont Stakes in 1947; and Luis Torres.

Several good horses have come out of Chile including "Desert Fight", the mare that won six races, with rider Alberto Solari Manasco, in eight runs in Chile against a score of fillies; and "Cougar II", the horse that in 2006 was elected into the American Horseracing Hall of Fame.

=== Motorsports ===
==== Auto racing ====
The first and most notable Chilean driver was Juan Zanelli, who competed in Grand Prix motor racing. motorsport and won 3 Grand Prix, as well as becoming champion in the European Hill Climb Championship. Eliseo Salazar is the only driver in the world to participate in the "magic square" of global motorsport, composed of the four traditional races: the Grand Prix of Monaco, the Indianapolis 500, the 24 hours of Le Mans, and the Dakar Rally. Pablo Donoso races in the Indy Pro Series, and is currently the highest performing Chilean driver.

Chile was elected, along with Argentina, as the seat of the 2009 Dakar Rally due to the suspension of this trial road rally on the continent of Africa. This trial is one of the world's toughest rallies, and competitive drivers like Eliseo Salazar and Carlo de Gavardo participate in the auto category. Gavardo was world champion in the bike rally and came in third in the 2001 Dakar Rally riding a KTM Sportmotorcycle.

The main motorsport category in the country is the Chilean Rally Championship (Called Rally Mobil by sponsorship interests). Since 2019, the city of Concepcion hosts the Rally Chile, part of the World Rally Championship calendar.

Since 2018, the Santiago ePrix is part of the Formula E calendar.

==== Motorcycle racing ====
The best competitor in motorcycle racing in Chile is Carlo de Gavardo, who has won international awards participating in enduro as well as cross-country rally, including the World Rally Championship.

Another World Champion is Francisco "Chaleco" López in the 450 cc category, somewhat surprising when taken into account the fact that the team did it with a Honda and not a KTM, the number one motorcycle used in rally.

== Rodeo ==
Chilean rodeo was recognized as a national sport in Chile, In the present is practiced in the more rural areas of the country. Chilean rodeo has been practiced in rural areas in central and southern regions of Chile for more than 400 years, but only in 1962, was it declared the national sport by letter number 269 of the National Sports Council and the Olympic Committee of Chile.

Every year, the National Championship Rodeo is held in Medialuna Monumental de Rancagua. Its greatest participants are Ramón Cardemil and Juan Carlos Loaiza, who have achieved the national title seven times.

== Shooting sports ==
=== Practical shooting ===
The sport of practical shooting is the most dynamic shooting sport in the world today. The worldwide organization for the sport is the International Practical Shooting Confederation (IPSC), founded in May 1976 in Columbia, Missouri, USA. Unlike traditional shooting sports in which the shooter is stationary, IPSC sportsmen using small arms try to hit a variety of shooting targets as they maneuver safely through a course that can require them to walk, run, and even jump over obstacles in their path. The game measures the accuracy of the shooter hitting targets as well as the amount of time it takes to complete the course. The athlete who can qualify the maximum number of points in the minimum length of time is declared the winner. IPSC shooting is practiced worldwide and international competitions are held in more than 70 countries. Tournaments vary in physical size from regional competitions to national championships, continental championships, and World Championships, which are held in cycles of three years. More than 700 competitors from about 70 member organizations attend these festivals in five days of competition and international goodwill. In Chile, this sport has been practiced since the early 1990s, when the Chile Federation was recognized and accepted as a member of the IPSC.

=== Shotgun shooting ===
Chile got its first world championship in shooting when Juan Enrique Lira won the trap shooting event at the 1965 World Shotgun Championships. Jorge Jottar won silver in the skeet shooting event that year. Alfonso de Iruarrizaga is a Chilean sports shooter and Olympic medalist. He received a silver medal in skeet shooting at the 1988 Summer Olympics in Seoul. Iruarrizaga was the only medalist for Chile at the 1988 Summer Olympics.

== Table tennis ==
Although Chile has not been featured worldwide in table tennis, it has on numerous occasions at the Pan American Games and the South American Games, without the need for nationalization of the sport, as with other countries. Among the leading table tennis players is Sofija Tepes. Felipe Olivares, only 15 years old, is the current teen world champion.

== Team sports ==
=== Association football ===
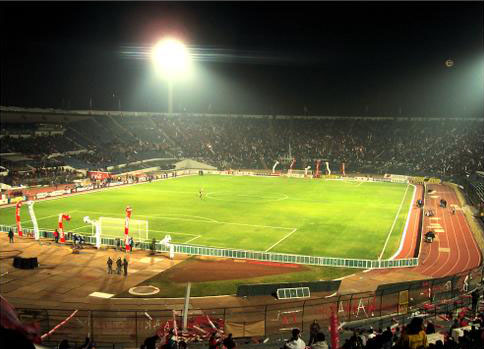
Estadio Nacional de Chile

Association football is the most popular sport in Chile, which in 1962 hosted the FIFA World Cup and won third place. Chile achieved a bronze medal in the 2000 Olympic Games; third in the 2007 FIFA World Youth Championship; and third place in the 1993 Under 17 Championship in Japan. The Chile national football team won the Copa América title in 2015 and the title in the Copa America Centenario in the US in 2016, and has played in five finals, and is the country in fourth place in the number of times it has attended the FIFA World Cup in South America.

As for clubs, the most important international achievement by a Chilean team was the tournament won by Colo-Colo in the Copa Libertadores in 1991. Also, Colo-Colo won the Copa Interamericana in 1991 and the 1992 Recopa Sudamericana. The Club Deportivo Universidad Católica won the Copa Interamericana in 1994, in 2011 the Club Universidad de Chile won the Copa Sudamericana.

Some of the best association football players in Chile have been Sergio Livingstone, Enrique Hormazábal, Leonel Sánchez, Elías Figueroa, Carlos Caszely, Roberto Rojas, Iván Zamorano, Humberto Suazo, Alexis, Arturo Vidal and Marcelo Salas.

=== Baseball ===
The majority of activity in the sport of baseball takes place in the northern part of Chile, where it was introduced from abroad in the early 20th century. It was first played by Americans in northern Chile, and later played by the Japanese Sakurada in Iquique, the city that would become the national champion in various events. Tocopilla is another major city that has won the national title over 18 consecutive times. Chile has participated in eight South American championships and was among the Top Ten in the 1989 Junior World Championship in Japan.

Baseball is played mainly in the cities of Iquique, Tocopilla, Antofagasta and Arica, as well as some other cities such as Santiago, San Antonio, Melipilla and Concepción.

=== Basketball ===
Basketball is a popular sport in Chile. The country earned a bronze medal in the first men's FIBA World Championship held in 1950, and won a second bronze medal when Chile hosted the 1959 FIBA World Championship. Chile hosted the first FIBA World Championship for Women in 1953, finishing the tournament with the silver medal.

In the last few years, basketball has regained the popularity it had in Chile in the 1950s and 1960s. The Basketball Senior Division of Chile (DIMAYOR) is the professional league which involves twelve teams, and the current champion is Club Liceo Mixto de Los Andes. Basketball is played mainly in the south part of the country, generally at the university level. Unlike football, basketball has South American men's titles at various levels, and a world women's basketball sub-championship.

Chile was third in world men's basketball in 1950 and 1954.

At the club level, Thomas Bata was the champion of Campeonato Sudamericano de Clubes Campeones in basketball in 1967 — the only South American Pacific Coast club with this achievement.

=== Cricket ===
Cricket has been played in Chile since 1829, and the first club, the Valparaíso Cricket Club was formed in 1860. Chile's first international fixture was played in 1893 against Argentina.

Interest in the game had waned after the Second World War, and Chile did not become a member of the International Cricket Council until 2002. Although, the sport regained some popularity due to the national team's participation at the World Cricket League, and the Chile women's national cricket team at the Women's version of the ICC Americas Championship. The national team's first international engagement as an ICC affiliate member was the Division 3 tournament of the ICC Americas Championship, played in Suriname in February 2006. The Chileans finished in third place, their only win coming against Brazil.

The February 2008 edition of the Division 3 tournament was held in Argentina. Chile defeated Belize, Turks and Caicos Islands, and Peru only to lose to Brazil. Chile finished the tournament second due to the net run rate.

Currently, Chile is a member of the ICC and actively develops programs for children. Although the sport in Chile is poorly understood and has very few athletes who practice it. Beach cricket has become very popular on the beaches of the Central Coast in the summer months. The second International Beach Cricket Tournament was held in February 2009 on the beach of Las Salinas Viña del Mar, in which more than eighty players, domestic and foreign, divided into ten teams.

=== Handball ===
Handball is little known in Chile, but the Chile women's national handball team qualified for the 2009 Women's World Handball Championship.

The sport is governed by the Federación Chilena de Handball, in turn affiliated with the Confederación Sudamericana de Balonmano, the Pan American Handball Federation and the International Handball Federation.

=== Roller hockey ===
Until the 1930s, roller hockey was played in Chile for recreation in Santa Licía Hill and in the Salón Merced. In 1938, the Santiago Association was formed and played in the Plaza de la Libertad in front of the Palacio de La Moneda. Then followed the founding of the Valparaíso Association, the Viña del Mar Association and the Andes Association. Three times Chile has won fourth place in the Men's World Roller Hockey Championship. Chile has hosted the Men's World Roller Hockey Championship twice, once in 1962, where every game was played in the National Gymnasium, and again in 1980 held in the port city of Talcahuano.

Chile hosted the 2006 Women's World Roller Hockey Championship and won the championship by defeating Spain in the final. And won the Roller Hockey America's Cup in 2007 and the Pan American Ice Hockey Championship in 2011.

=== Polo ===
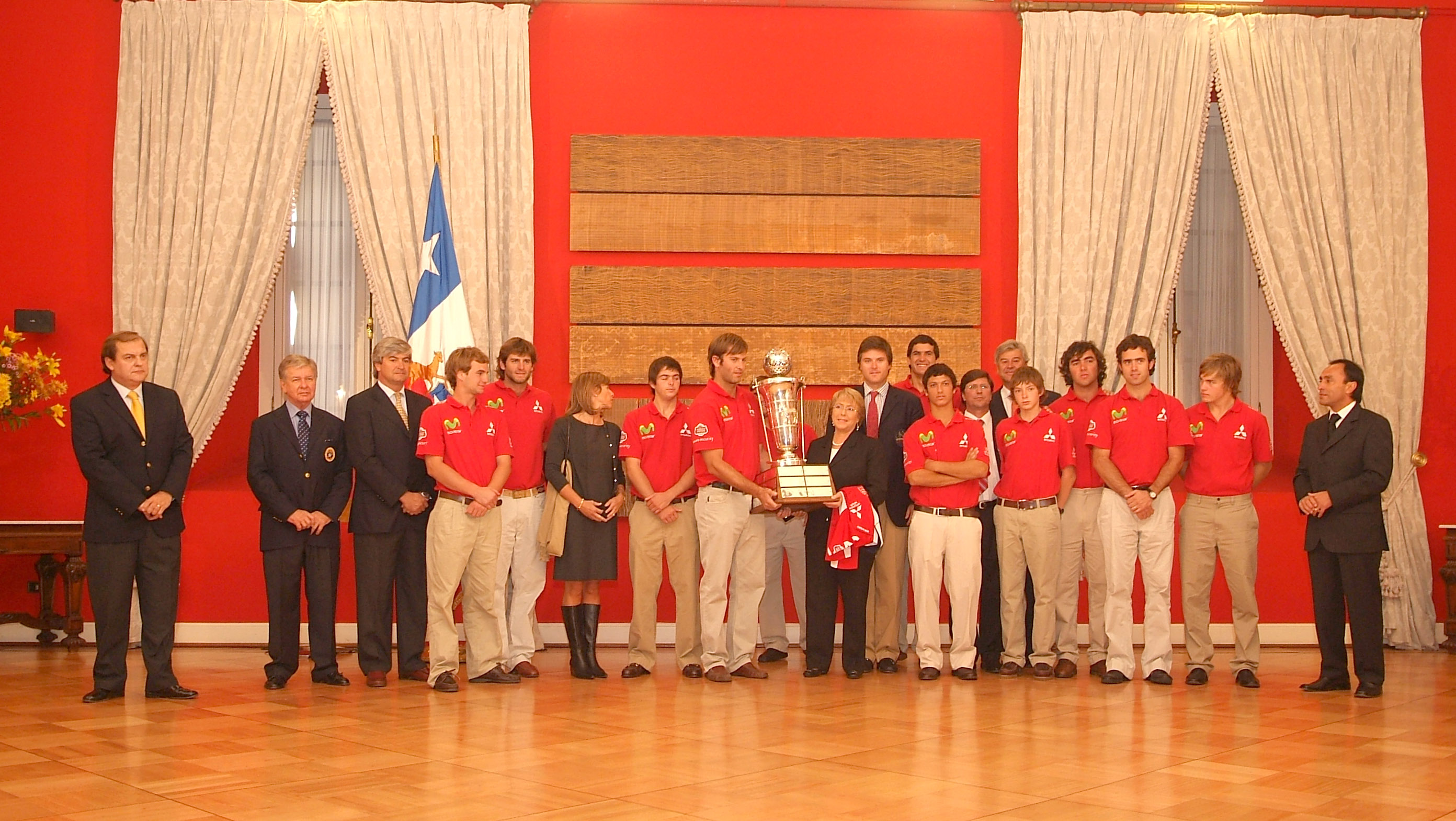
Chile World Champion Polo team, with President Michelle Bachelet and the trophy of the 2008 World Polo Championship.

Chile was the World Polo champion, in 2008, after beating Brazil 11–9 in the final game of the 2008 Polo World Cup in Mexico City. and in 2017 beating the United States 12–11.

The late Gabriel Donoso was the greatest polo player in Chile, having the highest handicap of 9 goals, and is remembered for having led the Chile national team to win the prestigious Coronation Cup, awarded by Queen Elizabeth II of the United Kingdom in 2004, and a second title in 2007. Chile hosted the World Polo Championship in 1992, where it won second place, and received third place in the 2004 World Cup held in France.

Chile as hosted the World Polo Championships of 1992 and 2015.

=== Rugby league football ===
Chile made its debut in Rugby league football in 2015. Although there have been no games on home soil; all players meet eligibility guidelines.

=== Rugby union football ===
Rugby union football has been played in Chile since at least the 1880s, introduced by the British. The Chile Rugby Union was formed in 1935 and was renamed the Rugby Federation of Chile in 1948. At present, rugby union football is one of the fastest-growing sports in Chile, especially in the universities. The Chile national rugby union team ("The Condors") qualified for their first Rugby World Cup in 2023, and recently qualified for their second in 2027. Chile is ranked 18th in the World Rugby rankings, making Chile the second-best team in Latin America, after Argentina.

Currently, there are 14 rugby associations distributed throughout the country (between Arica and Magallanes), plus a referees association. The most recognized Rugby teams in Chile are Club Deportivo Universidad Católica, Old Boys and Stade Francaise, in Santiago; Old Mackayans and Sporting, in Viña del Mar; and Los Troncos and Old John's, in Concepción.

=== Volleyball ===
Volleyball has been played regularly in Chile since the 1920s, with the first tournament in 1932. In 1942, the National Volleyball Association, the predecessor of the current Federation, was formed and organized the first national league.

Chile has received notoriety in the sport of volleyball only sporadically in South America, dominated by such powerhouses as Brazil and Argentina. Chile's greatest achievements in volleyball are second place in the 1961 South American Men's Volleyball Championship, and sixth place in the 1971 Pan American Tournament. Chile hosted the South American Championship in 1962 (male and female), 1981 (male), and 2007 (male and female).

Chile has qualified just once each in male and female for the World Volleyball Championships, both in 1982 — the 1982 World Women's Volleyball Championship in Peru and the 1982 Men's Volleyball Championship in Argentina.

In September 2020, Chile's beach volleyball women Francisca Rivas and Chris Vorpahl, finished third at an event of the FIVB Beach Volleyball World Tour in Vilnius, Lithuania, to secure bronze and put a Chilean female team on the podium at an international event for the first time.

== Tennis ==
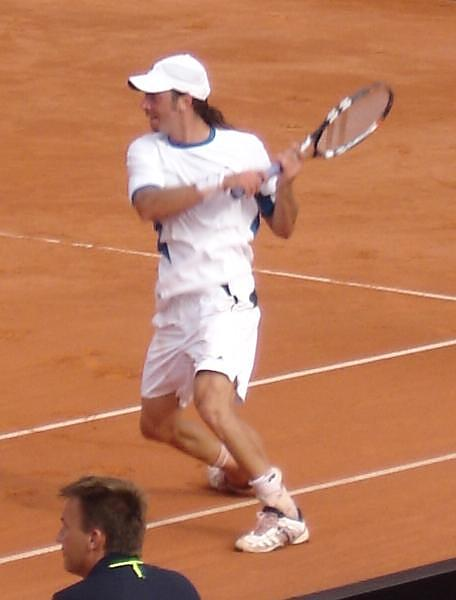
Nicolás Massú, Olympic tennis champion in 2004 Athens Olympic Games

Tennis is Chile's most successful sport. Its national team won the World Team Cup clay tournament two times (2003 and 2004), and played the Davis Cup final against Italy in 1976. At the 2004 Summer Olympics, the country captured gold and bronze in men's singles and gold in men's doubles. Marcelo Ríos became the first Latin American man to reach the number 1 spot in the ATP singles rankings in 1998. Anita Lizana won the US Open in 1937, becoming the first woman from Latin America to win a Grand Slam tournament. Luis Ayala was twice a runner-up at the French Open, and both Ríos and Fernando González reached the Australian Open men's singles finals.

Chilean players held in the highest regard are retired Marcelo Ríos, who was Number 1 in the World in the ranking of the Association of Tennis Professionals in 1998; and Luis Ayala, winner of two D Slams in doubles (with Roland Garros, 1958 and 1960) and two finals in singles, also ranked number five in the world. Prominent Chilean tennis player Anita Lizana was the first Latin American to win the Grand Slam (Forest Hills predecessor of the current US Open), and Hans Gildemeister was fifth in doubles in 1987 (with Andrés Gómez). Olympic medalists in tennis are Nicolás Massú and Fernando González.

Chile was the champion of the Tennis World Cup for teams in Düsseldorf (2003 and 2004) and was finalist in the Davis Cup in 1976. In 2004, tennis players Fernando González and Nicolás Massú won the first Olympic gold medals in the Athens Games, after strenuous games receiving the gold medal in doubles (Massú-González), bronze (González) and gold in singles (Massú). In the 2008 Beijing Olympic Games, Fernando González won the silver medal in singles.

With regard to the number 1 obtained by Marcelo Ríos, the gold medals in the Olympics, the bichampionship in Düsseldorf and the end of the Davis Cup, note that Chile was the first South American country to achieve these accomplishments.

Chile was a finalist in the Davis Cup in 1976, but was defeated by 4–1 by Italy at the National Stadium in Santiago.

In 1973, playing in the Davis Cup against the United States, Patricio Cornejo and Jaime Fillol won the longest set in the history of the Cup: 39–37 against the team of Stan Smith and Erik van Dillen.

== Weightlifting ==
Chile has gained various medals in weightlifting in Pan American and Ibero American Games. The greatest Chilean participant in weightlifting is Cristián Escalante Carroza, the Pan American champion in the field of more than 105 kilos. The last medal achieved by Chile was in the 2007 Pan American Games. The federation that governs the sport in Chile is FECHIPE.

== Water sports ==
=== Fishing ===
Fishing began in Chile with the introduction of salmon species into the country at the end of the 19th Century — with great success since the salmon didn't encounter any large enemies or predators in Chile's cold and temperate waters. Subsequently, the state, first as a social policy and then to promote aquaculture, played an active role in creating fish farms that released into rivers various species like rainbow trout, brown trout, brook trout; and anadromous species such as silver salmon, king salmon, and Atlantic salmon. As a result, a number of species have adapted well to the new environment.

There are no reliable statistics of the pastimes of Chileans, but it is believed that fishing is the third or fourth most popular hobby. Simple and low-cost fishing gear is the most popular. The most popular bait used includes earthworms, fresh-water crab, shrimp, snails, small fish, and white beans. The more complex fishing gear has gained in popularity with imported rods and reels running less than 5,000 Chilean pesos, and fly fishing gear selling for less than 50,000 Chilean pesos. Fly fishing is the fastest growing sector in sport fishing in Chile. Tourists have come to know Chile as the destination for salmon fishing. The increase in tour guides for tourist fishing has been explosive — from only a few fishing lodges in the 1990s, to over a dozen new lodges in the new century. Lawmakers and participants in sport fishing are working together to make new laws to help regulate the fishing tourism industry and ensure its longevity.

Freshwater sport fishing mainly occurs from Region V of Valparaíso to the south of Chile, being particularly successful and rich in freshwater species from Region IX of Araucanía to Region XII of Magallanes and Antártica Chilena, and tourism development is mainly concentrated in the Araucanía.

=== Rowing ===
Chile made history in the sport of rowing, when Christian Yantani and Miguel Ángel Cerda won the 2002 Rowing World Cup in Seville.

In 2005, Cerda and Felipe Leal won second place in the lightweight coxless trial in the World Rowing Championship in the Japanese city of Gifu. The following year, Chile won the team event in the South American Youth Rowing Championship in Paraguay. In the 2007 Pan American Games in Río de Janeiro, the pair of Sorayua Jadue and María José Orellana won the gold medal; and Miguel Cerda and Felipe Leal won the bronze in the lightweight pairs event.

Rowing is practiced in different cities, the primary being Valdivia, Concepción and Valparaíso due to the abundant rivers and numerous rowing clubs. Currently, the city of Santiago is developing a strong rowing program, specifically in Carén Lake (located close to Pudahuel with direct access to public transportation) and in Lake Acuelo.

=== Sailing ===
Chile is currently one of the top countries in the world in the sport of sailing because of Alberto "Tito" González who has won five championships. In 2005, González was given the Best Athlete Award by the Circulo de Periodistas Deportivos (Sports Writers Circle) and in 2006 received the Chilean Presidents Award for best sportsman. Most recently, Gonzalaz won the gold medal in the Pan American Games in Río. Gonzalaz has been asked to be the Chile flag bearer in the opening ceremony of the Pan American Games in Canada. He also has titles in J/24 and other categories as well as several American titles.

The sport does not have a large number of participants, however another notable Chilean sport sailor is found in Matías de Solar — ranked third in International Laser Class — who has qualified in the Olympic Games.

=== Swimming ===
Swimming has enjoyed a long history in Chile. Historically the best Chilean swimmer was the well-known Víctor "Tiburón" Contreras, famous for his times over long distances, who set the world record for crossing the Strait of Gibraltar.

Currently the best male swimmers are Maximiliano Schnettler and Giancarlo Zolezzi who are among the top 25 swimmers in the world. Female swimmer Kristel Köbrich has the best Chile national and South American records in the 800 meter and 1500 meter freestyle events. She was among the top 15 swimmers in the world in the 2004 Athens Olympic Games and in 2007, she won 7th place in the World Swimming Championship in the 1500 meters race.

== Winter sports ==
In the winter months, many Chileans participate in winter sports, especially skiing and snowboarding. Less than 35 kilometers from Santiago, ski resorts are located in El Colorado, Farellones, La Parva and Valle Nevado. Located in the Valparaíso Region is the resort of Portillo, which claims to be the oldest in South America and which hosted the 1966 World Alpine Ski Championships. Other major ski centers include Termas de Chillán, Antuco, Volcán Villarrica, and Antillanca. In addition, Chilean mountain climbers have reached major summits, such as Mount Everest.

While the country has excellent conditions for winter sports, Chile has never won a medal at the Winter Olympics.

In the 2014 Winter Olympics, in Sochi, Russia, Chile was represented by Noelle Barahona, Eugenio Claro, and Henrick Von Appen in alpine skiing; Dominique Ohaco (slopestyle) in freestyle skiing; and Yonathan Fernández in cross-country skiing.

== See also ==
- Chile at the Olympics
- Chile national football team
- Chilean Football Federation
- Sport in South America
