= South African Polo Association =

- Sport: Polo
- Jurisdiction: National
- Abbreviation: SAPA
- Founded: 1906
- Affiliation: Federation of International Polo
- Headquarters: South Africa
- Location: South Africa

Official website
- www.sapolo.co.za
- (South Africa)

The South African Polo Association (SAPA) is the governing body for the sport of polo in South Africa. It is affiliated with the Federation of International Polo (FIP) and the Hurlingham Polo Association.

The board of SAPA is made up of an elected president, a vice-president along with an Executive Committee consisting of provincial representatives, Ladies Polo representative, amongst other members elected during the association's AGM. SAPA's constitution was originally instituted in 1905 confirming it as one of the earliest sporting organisations established in South Africa. SAPA administers the season fixtures list for competitions, the handicaps of both amateur and professional polo players, the resolution of disciplinary issues related to the sport, the co-ordination of development programmes for the formerly disadvantaged persons and the governing of policies associated with polo and polo ponies. SAPA is accountable for providing sponsorship for its representative national teams participating in several international polo matches and competitions.

== History ==
Initially polo was originally the domain of British cavalry, but it was army officers from the infantry that introduced the game to the country. The former 75th (Stirlingshire) Regiment of Foot, then acknowledged as Gordon Highlanders, after military service in Singapore and Hong Kong, was posted to the Cape Province, and was engaged in minor exercises in Lower Drakensberg. The Duke of Cornwall's Light Infantry (the first Battalion), was stationed in South Africa around this time from Mauritius. The two regiments were based in King William's Town, close to East London. The Cape Mounted Rifles, which was a local South African unit was also stationed in the area. The first polo game on record was played in October 1874, between the Cape Mounted Rifles and the Gordon Highlanders in King William's Town Parade Ground.

Polo playing as a sport continued in Cape Town around 1885 at a polo club established by army officers, while in Natal, it was played by army officers based at Fort Napier. The following year, in 1886, the Garrison Polo Club was established in Pietermaritzburg. The Military Ninth Division engaged in polo matches around the 1880s at Harrismith, in the Free State, whereas the playing of polo in the Transvaal started in Johannesburg in 1894. The Dargle Polo Club was regarded as the first civilian club established in South Africa, although this claim is a subject of dispute by members of the Mooi River Polo Club. The South African Polo Calendar in 1902 noted the year of foundation as – 1886 for Dargle Polo Club and – 1889 for Mooi River Polo Club. Another of the pioneering civilian polo clubs was Tintern Polo Club, established around 1893. Subsequently, other civilian polo clubs established in the 1890s were Greytown, Durban, the Shaws’ Karkloof, Nottingham Road, Kokstad, Matatiele, Merino Walk and Underberg.

Polo started in Port Elizabeth around 1888. The South African Polo Association was established in 1906 to which five provincial associations became its affiliates – East Griqualand, Highveld, Free State, KwaZulu Natal and the Cape. There are around 38 polo clubs in South Africa with an estimated 450 polo players. It was around the late 1940s and the early 1950s that women's polo began in South Africa mainly through the efforts of Cicely FitzPatrick, that was highlighted when she launched the Addo Polo Club at Uitenhage, in the Cape Province. In 1932 the first officially recorded ladies' match was played between the ladies’ teams from Durban and Connington. In 1948, the Natal Ladies’ Polo Association was established.

== Provincial Polo Associations ==
The member associations are:

- Natal Polo Association
- Western Cape Polo Association
- Free State Polo Association
- Highveld Polo Association
- East Griqualand Polo Association

== See also ==
- Museum of Polo and Hall of Fame
