= Federation of International Polo =

International organization for polo

- Abbreviation: FIP
- Formation: 1982
- Type: Sports federation
- Headquarters: Montevideo, Uruguay
- Members: 82 (March 2022)
- President: Piero Dillier
- Website: fippolo.com

The Federation of International Polo (FIP) is the international federation representing the sport of Horse Polo, officially recognized by the International Olympic Committee. The FIP was founded in 1982 by representatives of eleven national polo associations, and it represents the national polo associations of more than 80 countries. Its principal aim is to enhance the international image and status of polo.

In addition to organising international tournaments, the FIP develops international tournaments for children, conducts umpiring and coaching seminars, encourages participation in the sport at all levels and ages, and makes the international rules of polo through a cooperative agreement with the Asociación Argentina de Polo, the Hurlingham Polo Association of Great Britain and Ireland, and the United States Polo Association.

== History ==
In 1978, Marcos Uranga organized the first international polo tournament for clubs. It was held in Buenos Aires, with representatives from polo clubs throughout South America. Inspired by the success of the tournament, Uranga began considering the idea of competitions between countries.

By the early 1980s, motivated by the desire to broaden the scope of international polo and reinstate its Olympic status, Uranga (who became president of the Argentine Polo Association) suggested an international organization of polo-playing countries. Uranga and former US ambassador Glen Holden had become friends, and he asked Holden for help. An initial meeting was held in Buenos Aires, and by April 1982 a federation was created with the polo associations of twelve countries. Its headquarters were in Argentina because that country was considered to have the most experience in organizing tournaments. It was suitable for polo practice, had many horses, and many foreigners attended the annual Argentine Open. Uranga was the FIP's first president, a position he held for 15 years.

The federation was created by Uranga and Holden on November 25, 1982, in Buenos Aires with representatives of the national polo associations of Argentina, Brazil, Colombia, Chile, El Salvador, France, Italy, Mexico, Peru, Spain and Zimbabwe. Its principal aim was to enhance the image and status of polo at the international level. In December of that year, the Argentine Polo Association invited the national polo associations of the twelve countries to a meeting to establish an international group that would promote international competitions, obtain recognition from the International Olympic Committee, standardise the rules of the sport, develop it worldwide, and support the breeding of polo ponies. When the FIP was founded, Uranga said that one of his primary objectives was to bring polo players together to enhance the sport. The federation was accepted as a member of the Global Association of International Sports Federations (GAISF) in October 1992 at the association's general assembly in Monaco.

The FIP is a non-profit organization registered in Uruguay at the Ministry of Education and Culture and governed by Uruguayan law. It is known as the Federación Internacional de Polo in Spanish, hence its acronym FIP. Uranga stepped down as FIP president in 1997, although he remained active in the federation. Its second president was Glen Holden.

=== IGF ===
The International Chovgan Federation (IGF) for Chovgan was established on 2 February 2024. The first IGF World Chovgan Championships was held in Azerbaijan in November of 2023. Azerbaijan national and Morocco in the final and Poland and Uzbekistan in the 3rd place. First IGF European Chovkan Championship was held in 3–7 June 2025.

=== Presidents ===
| Name | Country | Term |
|---|---|---|
| Marcos Uranga | Argentina | 1982–1998 |
| Glen Holden Sr. | United States of America | 1997–2006 |
| Patrick Guerrand-Hermès | Morocco | 2006–2009 |
| James Ashton | Australia | 2009–2010 |
| Eduardo Huergo | Argentina | 2010–2012 |
| Dr. Richard T. Caleel | United States of America | 2012–2014 |
| Nicholas Colquhoun-Denvers | United Kingdom | 2014–2018 |
| Horacio Areco | Argentina | 2018–2022 |
| Piero Dillier | Switzerland | 2022–present |

== Variant ==
1. Arena Polo
2. Beach Polo
3. Grass Polo
4. Snow Polo

== Membership ==
Member countries by type and zone
| Country | Type | Zone |
|---|---|---|
| Argentina | Full – A | B |
| Australia | Full – B | D |
| Austria | Full – A | C |
| Azerbaijan | Corresponding | C |
| Bahamas | Corresponding | A |
| Barbados | Corresponding | A |
| Belgium | Full – C | C |
| Bolivia | Contact | B |
| Brazil | Full – B | B |
| Brunei | Corresponding | D |
| Canada | Full – B | A |
| Chile | Full – B | B |
| China | Full – C | D |
| Colombia | Corresponding | B |
| Costa Rica | Full – C | A |
| Czech Republic | Corresponding | C |
| Dominican Republic | Corresponding | A |
| Ecuador | Corresponding | B |
| Egypt | Full – C | E |
| El Salvador | Contact | A |
| England | Full – A | C |
| Finland | Corresponding | C |
| France | Full – B | C |
| Germany | Full – B | C |
| Guatemala | Full – C | A |
| Hong Kong | Contact | D |
| Hungary | Contact | C |
| India | Full – B | E |
| Indonesia | Full – C | D |
| Iran | Full – B | E |
| Ireland | Full – C | C |
| Italy | Full – B | C |
| Jamaica | Corresponding | A |
| Japan | Full – C | D |
| Jordan | Corresponding | E |
| Kazakhstan | Full – C | C |
| Kenya | Corresponding | E |
| Korea | Corresponding | D |
| Kuwait | Full – C | E |
| Lebanon | Corresponding | E |
| Liechtenstein | Contact | C |
| Luxembourg | Contact | C |
| Malaysia | Full – B | D |
| Malta | Corresponding | C |
| Mexico | Full – B | A |
| Monaco | Full – C | C |
| Mongolia | Full – C | D |
| Morocco | Full – C | E |
| Netherlands | Full – C | C |
| New Zealand | Contact | E |
| Nicaragua | Corresponding | A |
| Nigeria | Full – B | E |
| Norway | Contact | C |
| Oman | Full – C | E |
| Pakistan | Full – C | E |
| Paraguay | Full – C | B |
| Peru | Full – C | B |
| Philippines | Full – C | D |
| Poland | Contact | C |
| Portugal | Full – C | C |
| Qatar | Corresponding | E |
| Romania | Contact | C |
| Russia | Full – C | C |
| San Marino | Corresponding | C |
| Saudi Arabia | Full – C | E |
| Singapore | Full – C | D |
| Slovakia | Full – C | C |
| South Africa | Corresponding | E |
| Spain | Full – B | C |
| Sweden | Full – C | C |
| Switzerland | Full – B | C |
| Thailand | Full – C | D |
| Tunisia | Corresponding | E |
| Turkey | Corresponding | C |
| Uganda | Contact | E |
| Ukraine | Full – C | C |
| United Arab Emirates | Full – C | E |
| Uruguay | Full – C | B |
| United States | Full – A | A |
| Uzbekistan | Full – C | E |
| Zambia | Contact | E |
| Zimbabwe | Corresponding | E |

=== Types ===
- Full — 48
  - Category A — Countries where polo is more developed — 4
  - Category B — Countries with more than 100 registered players, excluding Category A — 14
  - Category C — Countries with up to 100 registered players, excluding Category B — 30
- Corresponding members — 22
- Contact members — 12

=== Zones ===
- Zone A — North and Central America — 11
- Zone B — South America — 10
- Zone C — Europe — 28
- Zone D — East Asia and Oceania — 12
- Zone E — Africa and West Asia — 21

== FIP events ==
- World Polo Championship (Men / Women)
- Polo at the Summer Olympics
- Polo at the Pan American Games
- Polo at the 2007 Southeast Asian Games
- Polo at the 2017 Southeast Asian Games
- Polo at the 2019 Southeast Asian Games
- Polo at the 2025 Southeast Asian Games
- FIP Snow Polo World Cup Invitational : https://es.wikipedia.org/wiki/Copa_del_Mundo_de_Polo_en_Nieve_de_la_FIP
- FIP European Polo Championships
- FIP Ladies European Polo Championship
- FIP Super Nations Cup
- FIP Ambassador's Cup
- FIP Children's Championships
- European Championship : https://es.wikipedia.org/wiki/Campeonato_Europeo_de_Polo
- es:Campeonato Argentino Abierto de Polo

=== Non-FIP events ===
- PIPA Snow Polo World Cup Tour
- PIPA Beach Polo World Series
- Ezra Cup
- Mannheim May Market

== World championships ==
| Number | Year | Host | Winner |
|---|---|---|---|
| I | 1987 | Argentina | Argentina |
| II | 1989 | Germany | United States |
| III | 1992 | Chile | Argentina |
| IV | 1995 | Switzerland | Brazil |
| V | 1998 | United States | Argentina |
| VI | 2001 | Australia | Brazil |
| VII | 2004 | France | Brazil |
| VIII | 2008 | Mexico | Chile |
| IX | 2011 | Argentina | Argentina |
| X | 2015 | Chile | Chile |
| XI | 2017 | Australia | Argentina |
| XII | 2022 | United States | Spain |
| XIII | 2026 | United Arab Emirates | |

== European championships ==
=== Men ===
The European championship is a 6–8 goal tournament for all European FIP member countries. It was introduced in 1993 based on an idea by Reto Gaudenzi, the Swiss founder ambassador of the FIP who created the St. Moritz Snow Polo Tournament. The European championship's handicap provides an opportunity for European players and patrons to participate in a FIP event and represent their country. Due to Piero Dillier's work as zone C director, the event has grown in popularity. The European championship is unique in the close proximity of the European countries, which makes it easier for national federations to send ponies and players to the host country. It is the most valuable tournament, after the World Polo Championships. In 2018, during the XII FIP European Polo Championship and II FIP Ladies European Polo Championship (both at the Villa a Sesta Polo Club in Italy), the organization had a record attendance of European polo teams and countries.

European championships
| Year | Teams | Host | Gold medal match | Winner |
|---|---|---|---|---|
| 1993 | France; Germany; Switzerland; Spain; England; Italy | St. Moritz, Switzerland | England vs. Italy | England |
| 1995 | Germany; Switzerland; Spain; Sweden; Finland; France; Netherlands; England; Belgium | Antwerp, Belgium | England vs. Germany | England |
| 1997 | England; Italy; Spain; Switzerland; Netherlands; Sweden; Austria; Germany; France | Milan, Italy | England vs. Italy | England |
| 1999 | England; Italy; Switzerland; Germany; France; Belgium; Ireland; Spain; Netherlands | Chantilly, France | England vs. Ireland | England |
| 2002 | Belgium; England; France; Germany; Italy; Netherlands; Spain; Sweden; Switzerland | Rome, Italy | France vs. Netherlands | France |
| 2005 | Italy; England; Germany; Netherlands; Spain; Ireland; Belgium; France | Amsterdam, Netherlands | Italy vs. England | Italy |
| 2008 | Belgium; England; France; Germany; Ireland; Italy; Netherlands; Spain | Hamburg, Germany | England vs. Belgium | England |
| 2010 | France; Spain; Austria; England; Germany; Hungary; Italy; Netherlands; Slovakia; Switzerland | Vienna, Austria | France vs. Spain | France |
| 2012 | Spain; Austria; Italy; Germany; Ireland | Sotogrande, Spain | Spain vs. Austria | Spain |
| 2014 | England; Ireland; France; Italy; Netherlands; Germany; Austria; Spain | Chantilly, France | England vs. Ireland | England |
| 2016 | Ireland; France; Italy; Netherlands; Germany; Austria; Poland; Slovakia | Berlin, Germany | Ireland vs. France | Ireland |
| 2018 | Ireland; Italy; Azerbaijan; Switzerland; Netherlands; Austria; Slovakia; Germany; France; Spain | Villa a Sesta, Italy | Azerbaijan vs. Italy | Italy |
| 2021 | Spain; Switzerland; Netherlands; Austria; Italy; Germany | Sotogrande, Spain | Austria vs. Italy | Italy |

2023: 1- Spain 2- Azerbaijan 3- Germany

=== European Men's medals, 1993–2023 ===
| Rank | Nation | Gold | Silver | Bronze | Total |
|---|---|---|---|---|---|
| 1 | England (ENG) | 6 | 1 | 1 | 8 |
| 2 | Italy (ITA) | 3 | 2 | 0 | 5 |
| 3 | France (FRA) | 2 | 1 | 2 | 5 |
| 3 | Spain (ESP) | 2 | 1 | 2 | 5 |
| 5 | Ireland (IRL) | 1 | 2 | 2 | 5 |
| 6 | Austria (AUT) | 0 | 2 | 0 | 2 |
| 6 | Azerbaijan (AZE) | 0 | 2 | 0 | 2 |
| 8 | Germany (GER) | 0 | 1 | 3 | 4 |
| 9 | Netherlands (NED) | 0 | 1 | 1 | 2 |
| 10 | Belgium (BEL) | 0 | 1 | 0 | 1 |
| 11 | Switzerland (SUI) | 0 | 0 | 2 | 2 |
| 12 | Sweden (SWE) | 0 | 0 | 1 | 1 |
| Totals (12 entries) | | 14 | 14 | 14 | 42 |

FIP European Championships

European champions Final Runners-up Third place

1993, Jul 21-31 St. Moritz SUI ENG 11:3 ITA SUI

1995, Aug 17-27 Antwerpen BEL ENG 8:2 GER SUI

1997, Sep 05-14 Milano ITA ENG 9:3 ITA ESP

1999, Sep 18-26 Chantilly FRA ENG 6:4 IRL GER

2002, Sep 06-15 Roma ITA FRA 6:5,5 NED SWE

2005, Aug 26 - Sep 04 Vreeland NED ITA 9:6 ENG NED

2008, Sep 04-14 Hamburg GER ENG 7:3,5 BEL FRA

2010, Sep 03-12 Ebreichsdorf AUT FRA 10:8 ESP ENG

2012, Sep 07-16 Sotogrande ESP ESP 8:2 AUT IRL

2014, Sep 04-14 Chantilly FRA ENG 6:3 IRL FRA

2016, Aug 26 - Sep 04 Berlin GER IRL 7:4 FRA GER

2018, Sep 20-30 Villa a Sesta ITA ITA 8:4 AZE IRL

2021, Sep 12-19 Sotogrande ESP ITA 6:5 AUT ESP

2023, Sep 01-10 Düsseldorf GER ESP 9:6 AZE GER

2021: Originally planned on 2020, Sep 10–20 in Baku AZE first postponed to 2021, Sep 01–12, finally relocated on 2021, Jun 03 due to the COVID-19 pandemic.

FIP Ladies European Championships

European champions Final Runners-up Third place

2017, Apr 30 - May 7 Chantilly FRA ITA 5:4 FRA GER

2018, Sep 20-30 Villa a Sesta ITA GER 9:4,5 ITA NED

2021, Sep 22-26 Milano ITA ITA 6,5:6 ENG IRL

2023, Jul 03-09 Punta Ala ITA GER --- ITA FRA

=== Women ===
- 2017 – Chantilly, France (4 teams)
  - Winner: Italy
  - Runner-up: France
  - Third place: Germany
  - Fourth place: England
- 2018 – Villa a Sesta, Italy (4 teams)
  - Winner: Germany
  - Runner-up: Italy
  - Third place: Netherlands
  - Fourth place: France
- 2021 - La Mimosa Polo Club, Italy (4 teams)
  - Winner: Italy
  - Runner-up: England
  - Third place: Ireland
  - Fourth place: Germany

=== Women's medals, 2017–2023 ===
| Rank | Nation | Gold | Silver | Bronze | Total |
|---|---|---|---|---|---|
| 1 | Italy (ITA) | 2 | 2 | 0 | 4 |
| 2 | Germany (GER) | 2 | 0 | 1 | 3 |
| 3 | France (FRA) | 0 | 1 | 1 | 2 |
| 4 | England (ENG) | 0 | 1 | 0 | 1 |
| 5 | Ireland (IRL) | 0 | 0 | 1 | 1 |
| 5 | Netherlands (NED) | 0 | 0 | 1 | 1 |
| Totals (6 entries) | | 4 | 4 | 4 | 12 |

== Other FIP tournaments ==
=== Children's polo ===
Every year, FIP and the polo federations of member countries organize events for children under 14. Players arrive a week before the tournament, and stay at the homes of families of local players. The Polo Training Federation of the US, the FIP, and El Dorado member Fred Mannix sponsored one of the first FIP children's tournaments in 1991.

=== FIP Snow Polo World Cup Invitational ===
First conceived in 1959, snow polo did not get its official start until 1985, when the first match was played on the frozen surface of Lake St. Moritz in Switzerland. Although the first match attracted only 1,000 spectators, snow polo has become more popular and is also played in Italy, Austria, France, the United States, Argentina, Russia, Spain and China.

Snow polo is notably gaining ground in China, where the inaugural Snow Polo World Cup Invitational was held in 2012 at the Tianjin Goldin Metropolitan Polo Club. The tournament is played according to FIP snow-polo rules. The Metropolitan Polo Club is China's largest polo facility. The tournament, hosted by the Equestrian Association of China and the FIP, is organized by the Tianjin Sports Bureau, the Hong Kong Polo Development and Promotion Federation (HKPDPF) and the Tianjin Polo Association with sponsor support.

- 2012 – Tianjin, China – (12 teams)
  - Winner: Hong Kong
  - Runner-up: South Africa
  - Other participants: England (third place), Argentina (fourth), Australia, Brazil, Chile, Italy, India, the US, New Zealand, France
- 2013 – Tianjin, China – (12 teams)
  - Winner: Hong Kong
  - Runner-up: Argentina
  - Other participants: England (third), South Africa (fourth), Australia, Brazil, Chile, Canada, India, the US, France, New Zealand
- 2014 – Tianjin, China (12 teams)
  - Winner: England
  - Runner-up: Hong Kong
  - Other participants: Australia, Brazil, Canada, Chile, France, Mexico, New Zealand, South Africa, Spain, the US
- 2015 – Tianjin, China (12 teams)
  - Winner: Brazil
  - Runner up: the US
  - Other participants: Argentina (third), France (fourth), Canada, Chile, England, Hong Kong, Mexico, Peru, New Zealand, Spain
- 2016 – Tianjin, China (six teams)
  - Winner: Hong Kong
  - Runner up: England
  - Other teams: Chile (third), Argentina (fourth), Canada, France
- 2017 – Tianjin, China (six teams)
  - Winner: Argentina
  - Runner-up: Hong Kong
  - Other teams: South Africa (third), England (fourth), Australia, US

=== FIP Super Nations Cup ===
With four professional teams from the world's leading polo nations, the 24-goal tournament has been held at the Tianjin Goldin Metropolitan Polo Club.

- 2012
  - Winner: Argentina
  - Runner-up: US
  - Third place: Hong Kong
- 2013
  - Winner: Hong Kong
  - Runner-up: England
  - Third place: US
  - Fourth place: Argentina
- 2014
  - Winner: Hong Kong
  - Runner-up: England
  - Third place: US
  - Fourth place: Argentina

=== Ambassador's Cup ===
FIP ambassadors are liaisons between the federation and individual countries. They represent the FIP's goals and objectives in his or her own country and work on behalf of the federation in other countries. An ambassador is asked to reach specific goals set by the FIP president, and are expected to support all FIP events with time, effort and horses. FIP ambassadors were created when the federation was founded to promote it in their own polo association and increase interest in the sport.

Nineteen countries signed up within a few years of FIP's founding, with ten more provisional members. The main vehicle for recruiting new member countries was a series of tournaments which became known as Ambassador's Cups. The tournaments originated as competition for FIP members and collaborators to engage them in the sport beyond the organizational realm and play polo in different parts of the world. One of the first Ambassador's Cups was held in Moscow to revive the sport, which had been abolished during the Russian Revolution in 1918. The tournament was played in a circus tent, since there were no fields.

Ambassador's Cup
| Edition | Date | City | Region/State | Country | Teams |
|---|---|---|---|---|---|
| 1 | November 1987 | Buenos Aires | Buenos Aires | Argentina | Unknown |
| 2 | January 1988 | Santiago | | Chile | 5 |
| 3 | April 1988 | Palm Springs | California | (United States) US | 7 |
| 4 | 1988 | Palm Beach | Florida | (United States) US | 8 |
| 5 | March 1989 | Santiago | | Chile | 12 |
| 6 | October 1989 | Buenos Aires | Buenos Aires | Argentina | 4 |
| 7 | March 1990 | Sydney | New South Wales | Australia | 8 |
| 8 | October 1990 | Unknown | Unknown | Brazil | 30 |
| 9 | November 1990 | Buenos Aires | Buenos AIres | Argentina | 16 |
| 10 | April 1991 | Buenos Aires | Buenos Aires | Argentina | 8 |
| 11 | November 1991 | Buenos Aires | Buenos Aires | Argentina | 12 |
| 12 | April 1992 | Unknown | Unknown | Brazil | 16 |
| 13 | November 1992 | Buenos Aires | Buenos Aires | Argentina | 12 |
| 14 | April 1993 | Mexico City | Mexico City | Mexico | 14 |
| 15 | August 1993 | Unknown | Unknown | Zimbabwe | 16 |
| 16 | September 1993 | Buenos Aires | Buenos Aires | Argentina | Unknown |
| 17 | November 1993 | Buenos Aires | Buenos Aires | Argentina | 19 |
| 18 | April 1994 | Buenos Aires | Buenos Aires | Argentina | 8 |
| 19 | May 1994 | Unknown | Unknown | Brazil | 28 |
| 20 | November 1994 | Buenos Aires | Buenos Aires | Argentina | 16 |
| 21 | November 1994 | Buenos Aires | Buenos Aires | Argentina | 16 |
| 22 | February 1995 | Lahore | Punjab | Pakistan | 4 |
| 23 | February 1995 | Costa Careyes | Jalisco | Mexico | 6 |
| 24 | April 1995 | Buenos Aires | Buenos Aires | Argentina | 8 |
| 25 | August 1995 | Unknown | England | United Kingdom | 6 |
| 26 | September 1995 | Buenos Aires | Buenos Aires | Argentina | 8 |
| 27 | November 1995 | Buenos Aires | Buenos Aires | Argentina | 16 |
| 28 | January 1996 | San José | San José Province | Costa Rica | 8 |
| 29 | March 1996 | Lake Worth | Florida | (United States) US | 9 |
| 30 | October 1996 | Jaipur | Rajasthan | India | Unknown |
| 31 | November 1996 | Buenos Aires | Buenos Aires | Argentina | 10 |
| 32 | February 1997 | Santiago | | Chile | 16 |
| 33 | Unknown | Unknown | Unknown | Unknown | Unknown |
| 34 | Unknown | Unknown | Unknown | Unknown | Unknown |
| 35 | Unknown | Unknown | Unknown | Unknown | Unknown |
| 36 | October 1998 | Buenos Aires | Buenos Aires | Argentina | Unknown |
| 37 | April 1999 | Chantilly | Hauts-de-France | France | 14 |
| 38 | October 1999 | Buenos Aires | Buenos Aires | Argentina | 8 |
| 39 | February 2000 | Punta del Este | Maldonado | Uruguay | 4 |
| 40 | April 2000 | Casa de Campo | La Romana | Dominican Republic | 12 |
| 41 | 2000 | Unknown | Unknown | Spain | Unknown |
| 42 | November 2000 | Buenos Aires | Buenos Aires | Argentina | 4 |
| 43 | September 2001 | Johannesburg | Gauteng | South Africa | Unknown |
| 44 | November 2001 | Buenos Aires | Buenos Aires | Argentina | 16 |
| 45 | April 2002 | Mexico City | Mexico City | Mexico | Unknown |
| 46 | November 2002 | Buenos Aires | Buenos Aires | Argentina | Unknown |
| 47 | September 2003 | Chantilly | Hauts-de-France | France | Unknown |
| 48 | Unknown | Unknown | Unknown | Unknown | Unknown |
| 49 | December 2003 | Bariloche | Río Negro | Argentina | 8 |
| 50 | June 2004 | Indaiatuba | São Paulo | Brazil | Unknown |
| 51 | October 2004 | Buenos Aires | Buenos Aires | Argentina | 9 |
| 52 | May 2005 | Sotogrande | Andalusia | Spain | 12 |
| 53 | September 2005 | Berlin | Berlin | Germany | 8 |
| 54 | November 2005 | Buenos Aires | Buenos Aires | Argentina | 10 |
| 55 | March 2006 | New Delhi | Delhi | India | 7 |
| 56 | August 2006 | Ulaanbaatar | Ulaanbaatar | Mongolia | 4 |
| 57 | September 2006 | Aiken | South Carolina | (United States) US | 4 |
| 58 | December 2006 | Salta | Salta | Argentina | 10 |
| 59 | April 2007 | Orlândia | São Paulo | Brazil | 10 |
| 60 | June 2007 | Unknown | England | United Kingdom | 8 |
| 61 | November 2007 | Buenos Aires | Buenos Aires | Argentina | 24 |
| 62 | September 2008 | New York | New York | (United States) US | 8 |
| 63 | September 2008 | Teheran | Ostān-e-Tehrān | Iran | 4 |
| 64 | November 2008 | Lima | Lima Province | Peru | 4 |
| 65 | November 2008 | Mar del Plata | Buenos Aires Province | Argentina | 8 |
| 66 | March 2009 | Sydney | New South Wales | Australia | Unknown |
| 67 | April 2009 | Kuala Lumpur | Wilayah Persekutuan | Malaysia | 4 |
| 68 | September 2009 | Siena | Toscana | Italy | Unknown |
| 69 | November 2009 | Quito | Pichincha Province | Ecuador | Unknown |
| 70 | November 2009 | Buenos Aires | Buenos Aires | Argentina | Unknown |
| 71 | September 2010 | Unknown | New York State | (United States) US | 8 |
| 72 | September 2010 | Lima | Lima Province | Peru | Unknown |
| 73 | November 2010 | San Luis | San Luis | Argentina | 8 |
| 74 | February 2011 | Costa Careyes | Jalisco | Mexico | 4 |
| 75 | November 2011 | Santiago | | Chile | Unknown |
| 76 | March 2012 | New Delhi | Delhi | India | 6 |
| 77 | April 2012 | Palm Beach | Florida | (United States) US | 8 |
| 78 | November 2012 | Buenos Aires | Buenos Aires | Argentina | 12 |
| 79 | April 2013 | Palm Beach | Florida | (United States) US | 6 |
| 80 | September 2013 | Rome | Lazio | Italy | 5 |
| 81 | November 2013 | Buenos Aires | Buenos Aires | Argentina | 12 |
| 82 | April 2014 | Palm Beach | Florida | (United States) US | 6 |
| 83 | June 2014 | Teheran | Ostān-e-Tehrān | Iran | 8 |
| 84 | September 2014 | Rome | Lazio | Italy | 6 |
| 85 | November 2014 | Buenos Aires | Buenos Aires | Argentina | 16 |
| 86 | September 2015 | Victoria | British Columbia | Canada | 6 |
| 87 | October 2015 | Rome | Lazio | Italy | 4 |
| 88 | November 2015 | Buenos Aires | Buenos Aires | Argentina | 12 |
| 89 | April 2016 | Port Mayaca | Florida | (United States) US | 8 |
| 90 | July 2016 | London | England | United Kingdom | 6 |
| 91 | September 2016 | Rome | Lazio | Italy | 6 |
| 92 | December 2016 | Buenos Aires | Buenos Aires | Argentina | 12 |
| 93 | May 2017 | Santa Barbara | California | (United States) US | 6 |
| 94 | April 2017 | Courances | Île-de-France | France | 6 |
| 95 | September 2017 | Rome | Lazio | Italy | Unknown |
| 96 | November 2017 | Buenos Aires | Buenos Aires | Argentina | Unknown |
| 97 | April 2018 | Unknown | Unknown | (United States) US | 8 |
| 98 | May 2018 | Santiago de Querétaro | Querétaro | Mexico | 8 |
| 99 | July 2018 | Rome | Lazio | Italy | 12 |
| 100 | September 2018 | Indaiatuba | São Paulo | Brazil | 20 |
| 101 | December 2018 | Buenos Aires | Buenos Aires | Argentina | 12 |
| 102 | Unknown | Unknown | Unknown | Unknown | Unknown |
| 103 | Unknown | Unknown | Unknown | Unknown | Unknown |
| 104 | October 2019 | Lahore | Punjab | Pakistan | 6 |
| 105 | Unknown | Unknown | Unknown | Unknown | Unknown |
| 106 | Unknown | Unknown | Unknown | Unknown | Unknown |
| 107 | November 2021 | Unknown | Unknown | Argentina | Unknown |
| 108 | February 2022 | Punta del Este | Maldonado | Uruguay | 4 |
| 109 | August 2022 | Asunción | Asunción | Paraguay | 8 |

=== Women's Nations Cup ===
The Women's Nations Cup was played from 12 to 16 December 2021 in Argentina. Three teams participated: Argentina, England and the US. The tournament was played with a 16-22 handicap at Palermo Polo Fields.

Rosters:

- England (21):
  - Georgie Cunningham (0)
  - Steph Haverhals (4)
  - Milly Hine (7)
  - Hazel Jackson (10)
- US (21):
  - Cecelia Cochran (5)
  - Dawn Jones (6)
  - Meghan Gracida (3)
  - Hope Arellano (7)
- Argentina (22):
  - Lia Salvo (10)
  - Milagros Sanchez (7)
  - Azucena Uranga (5)
  - Paulina Vasquetto (0)

== See also ==
- World Polo Championship
- Horseball
- Association of IOC Recognised International Sports Federations
- International Chovgan Federation (IGF) for Chovgan established on 2 February 2024
