= Cricket in Chile =

- Country: Chile
- National team(s): Chile

International competitions
- Cricket World Cup; ICC World Twenty20; ICC Champions Trophy; Women's Cricket World Cup; Under-19 Cricket World Cup

Cricket in Chile is a minor but growing sport. The Chilean playing season runs from September to December. There are at least 10 cricket clubs and 2 turf pitches in Chile.

== History ==
Cricket is first recorded as having been played in Chile at Valparaíso in 1829 between the crew of two Royal Navy vessels. The countries oldest cricket club, Valparaíso Cricket Club was formed in 1860 and hosted regular matches throughout the 19th and early 20th century between the clubs of Concepción and the Prince of Wales Country Club. These teams mostly contained British expatriates. In 1893, Chile played its first international match against Argentina, a fixture in which it took the Argentine team 3 days to cross the Andes to reach Santiago to fulfill the fixture. The exodus of British expatriates in the post war years led to a rapid decline in the sport in Chile.

From the 1960s onward, the game was just about kept alive by the few expatriates that remained. In 2001, Chile were admitted to the International Cricket Council as an Affiliate member. They made their debut in an ICC event in the 2006 Americas Championship Division Three. Chile have played in this division ever since.

The game in Chile has an ambitious development programme to take the game to the local population, which has focused on a large part to introducing the sport to schools, with an estimated 3,000 children having been introduced to cricket.

== Governing body ==
The Chilean Cricket Association is the official governing body of cricket in Chile. Its current headquarters is in Santiago. Asociación Chilena de Cricket is Chile's representative at the International Cricket Council.

== Domestic competitions ==
The main domestic tournament in Chile is the Metropolitan Cup, which contains 6 teams. This competition has been held since the 2001/02 season. There is a second division which contains 4 teams. Alongside this is the Condaroo 20/20 League, which is played in the Twenty20 format.

=== Domestic teams ===
Listed below are 6 clubs that currently make up the Metropolitan Cup, the highest level of domestic cricket in Chile:

- Las Condes Cricket Club
- Santiago Cricket Club
- La Dehesa Cricket Club
- Viña XI Cricket Club
- La Reina Cricket Club
- Estación Central Cricket Club

== Grounds ==
There are currently 7 cricket grounds in Chile. Only two of these have turf pitches.

== National team ==
The Chile national cricket team represents the country in international cricket matches. The national team, formed in 2006. They play in the ICC Americas Championship.

== See also ==
- Sport in Chile
