= Polo Instructors and Players Association =

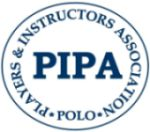

The Polo Instructors´ and Players´ Association (with or without the apostrophe) is the usual term for the worldwide organization of polo players and instructors. The organization is responsible for both male and female players and instructors.

== Tasks and Goals ==
The main aim of the association is to develop polo as a sport accessible for everybody and to set high educational and infrastructural standards for Polo schools all across the world.

Therefore, PIPA develops and establishes polo academies and polo schools worldwide and enables existing polo schools or clubs to become a partner. PIPA also ensures that polo trainers are always up-to-date and educated in regard to technical standards and know-how. Only PIPA licensed instructors may teach at PIPA certified polo schools and academies.

International Championship Tours

In cooperation with A Quechua World of Polo, PIPA organizes Snow and Beach Polo World Cups every year, including events at the Munich Olympicparc with more than 15,000 spectators every day, in Bad Gastein, and the Olympic Region Seefeld.

In the summer, the European Beach Polo Mega event takes place in Lignano Sabbiadoro in Italy. Every year at the end of August, thousands of polo enthusiasts come to Lignano to watch the best „Non patron based“ Beach Polo Teams in the world.

The PIPA tournament series are featured in equestrian and sports media. In 2015, the events are mentioned in equine magazine Reitsportnews, at the Seefeld blog and on the British website hurlinghampolo.com. View ORF (broadcaster) reporting on the tournament in Bad Gastein:.

== Organisation ==
The PIPA headquarters are located in Vienna, Austria. The Association is headed by an International PIPA Executive Board. Beneath the PIPA Executive Board there are also many Country Representatives from countries all across the globe. Some of the Country Representatives are famous names in the sport of Polo, such as the Argentinian Cacho Merlos for example.

=== Officers ===
The officers of the association are:

- Executive President: Dr. Uwe Seebacher (MBA) (Vienna)
- Executive Vice President: Cacho Merlos (Argentina)
- Vice President Horsemanship: Dr. Yvonne Halden, MSc (Austria)
- Vice President Ladies: Sarah Woods (England)
- Vice President Marketing & Sponsoring: Thomas Hofirek (Austria)
- Vice President Operations: Augusto Faria Correa (Porto Alegre)
- Clerk Executive: Prof. Mag. Bruno Seebacher (Graz)

OPERATIONAL BOARD

- Head of Corporate Design: Axel Schmitt (Austria)
- Head of Communications: Stefan Prath (Austria)
- Head of Tournament Management: Evelyn Hartmann (Austria)
- Head of Umpiring: Sean Dayus (England)

== See also ==
- Arena polo
- Association of IOC Recognised International Sports Federations
- International Federation for Equestrian Sports
- PIPA Snow Polo World Cup Tour
- PIPA Beach Polo World Series
- Polo
- Federation of International Polo
