= 1998 World Polo Championship =

The 1998 World Polo Championship was played in Santa Barbara, California, United States during August 1998 and was won by Argentina. This event brought together six teams from around the world in the Santa Barbara Polo & Racquet Club and San Diego Polo Club.

== Final match ==
August 30, 1998

Argentina	12–7	Brazil

Santa Barbara Polo & Racquet Club, Santa Barbara, California

(Argentina) Lucas Labat
(Argentina) Pablo Spinacci
(Argentina) Gerardo Colaroen
(Argentina) Ramiro Guinazu

(Brazil) Luis Bastos
(Brazil) Olavo Novaes
(Brazil) Angelo Bastos
(Brazil) Calao de Mello

== Final rankings ==
Rank	Team
1	Argentina
2	Brazil
3	England
4	United States
5	Australia
6	Guatemala
