= 2017 World Polo Championship =

2017 World Polo Championship

Tournament details
- Host country: Australia
- Dates: 21 October – 30 October 2017
- Teams: 8

Final positions
- Champions: Argentina (5th title)
- Runners-up: Chile
- Third place: England

Tournament statistics
- Matches played: 14

The 2017 World Polo Championship was held at the Sydney Polo Club and was the eleventh edition of the tournament.

Destination NSW was the strategic Sponsor of the 2017 World Polo Championship. The event took place in October 2017. The tournament saw the world's eight best nations compete for the world title in Sydney's Hawkesbury region. Argentina beat Chile in the final securing their fifth title.

== Fixture and Results ==
=== Pool Stage ===
Results

Date	Group	Team 1	Team 2	Score
October 21	Group A	Argentina	United States	12–9½
October 21	Group A	Australia	Spain	10–9
October 22	Group B	England	India	16–1
October 22	Group B	Chile	New Zealand	9–2
October 24	Group A	United States	Australia	7–5
October 24	Group A	Argentina	Spain	12–3½
October 25	Group B	New Zealand	England	11–8
October 25	Group B	Chile	India	11–2
October 28	Group A	Argentina	Australia	9–5½
October 28	Group A	United States	Spain	15–9½
October 28	Group B	England	Chile	8–5
October 28	Group B	New Zealand	India	9–8

== Knockout matches ==
Finals
Argentina	8
Chile	7
Third place
United States	5
England	6

== Final ==
October 30, 2017

Argentina	8–7	Chile
	Report

Sydney Polo Club, Richmond, New South Wales
