= Snow Polo World Cup St. Moritz =

Annual international snow polo tournament in Switzerland

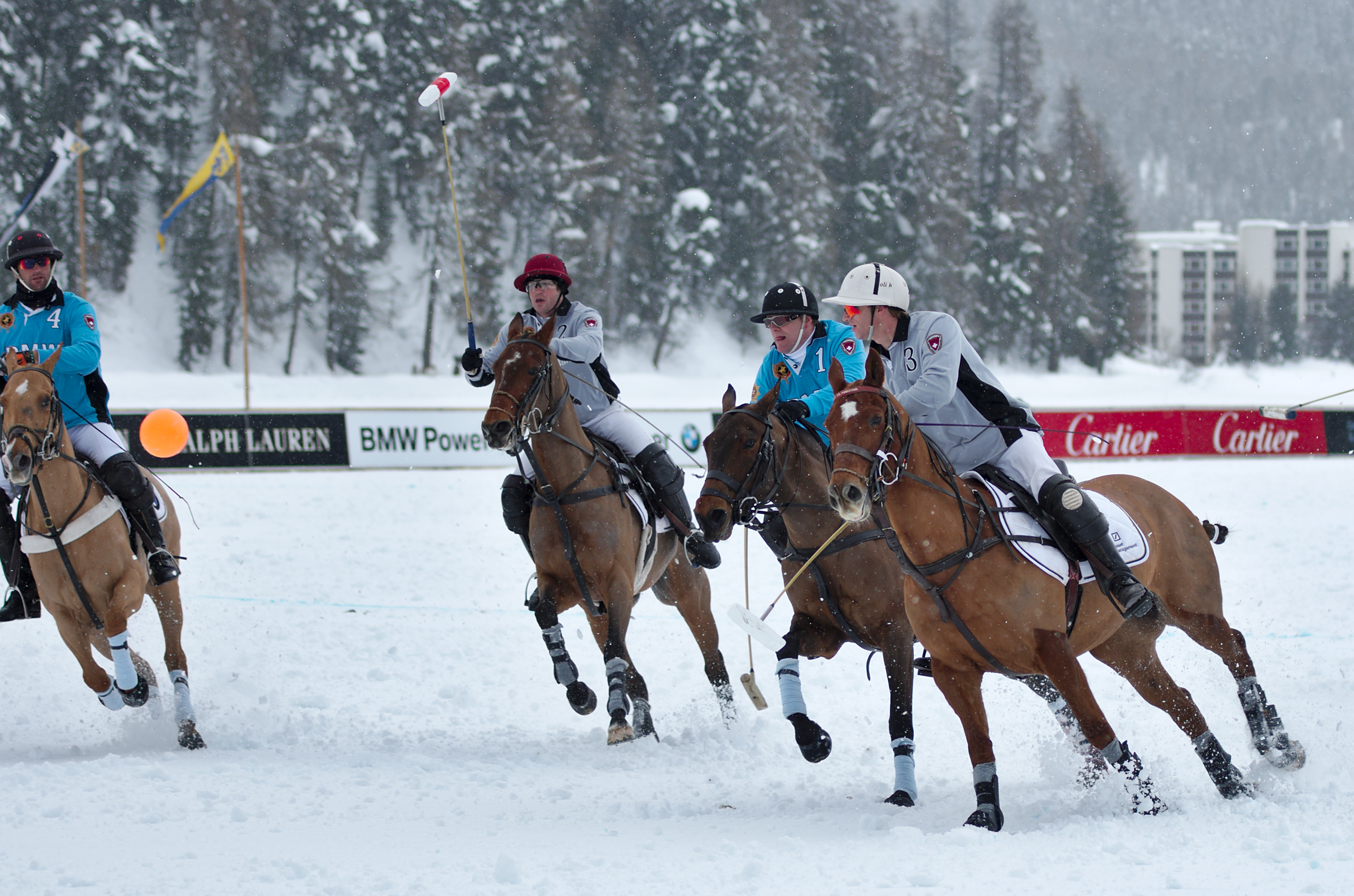
Snow polo match on the frozen Lake St. Moritz

Snow Polo World Cup St. Moritz is an annual international high-goal polo tournament held on the frozen Lake St. Moritz in St. Moritz, Switzerland. First staged in 1985, it is recognised as the world’s first and oldest polo tournament played on snow, marking the world premiere of polo as a winter sport.

The tournament is typically held in late January and features six international teams competing over several days on a snow field prepared on the frozen lake.

== History ==
=== Early polo in St. Moritz ===
Polo has been played in St. Moritz since 1899, when one of the earliest polo fields in continental Europe was established by British military officers stationed in the region. Following the withdrawal of British cavalry units, organised polo activity in St. Moritz declined for several decades.

In 1959, the St. Moritz Polo Club was founded, with P. R. Berry serving as its first president. Between 1960 and 1964, the club organised summer polo tournaments before the grounds were later converted into a high-altitude training facility in preparation for the 1968 Summer Olympics in Mexico City.

=== Development of Swiss polo ===
In 1978, Swiss polo player and organiser Reto G. Gaudenzi founded a St. Moritz-based polo team that competed internationally. Following Berry’s death in 1983, Christian Mathis became president of the St. Moritz Polo Club.

That same year, Gaudenzi founded the Swiss Polo Association and helped establish the Swiss national polo team. Switzerland played its first international match with an all-Swiss squad in 1983, defeating Spain 7–6 in Barcelona, an upset regarded as a milestone in Swiss polo history.

=== Founding of the Snow Polo World Cup ===
On the initiative of Reto G. Gaudenzi, the first polo tournament played on snow was staged on the frozen Lake St. Moritz in 1985, establishing what became the Snow Polo World Cup St. Moritz.

The event marked the first formal adaptation of polo to snow and ice conditions and contributed to the development of snow polo as a recognised variant of the sport.

In 1991, redesigned polo grounds in St. Moritz enabled the return of international summer competitions. The town subsequently hosted the FIP European Polo Championship in 1993 and the FIP Polo World Championship in 1995. Matches from the 1995 championship were broadcast live worldwide by Swiss public broadcaster SRF.

To ensure sufficient horses for training and competition, a dedicated polo horse pool was established in 1994.

=== Modern era ===
In 2005, a commemorative volume titled 20 Years Cartier Polo World Cup on Snow St. Moritz was published to mark the tournament’s twentieth anniversary.

Since 2015, the tournament has been officially known as the Snow Polo World Cup St. Moritz and has been organised under the ownership of Evviva Polo St. Moritz AG, with Reto G. Gaudenzi again involved in its leadership.

== Format and competition ==
The Snow Polo World Cup St. Moritz is contested as a high-goal polo tournament, the highest level of the sport. Six teams with combined handicaps typically ranging between 15 and 22 goals compete annually for the Snow Polo World Cup St. Moritz Trophy.

Matches are played over several days on a snow field constructed on the frozen lake. Polo Times has reported on the tournament’s logistical and safety preparations, including ice testing and field construction, which are required before play can commence.

== Sporting significance ==
The Snow Polo World Cup St. Moritz is widely regarded within the sport as the most prestigious and highest-profile snow polo tournament worldwide, due to its longevity, high-goal format, and consistent participation by internationally ranked players. It is frequently cited as a flagship event within the winter polo calendar and has influenced the establishment of snow polo tournaments in other alpine and winter resort destinations.

== Winners ==
A complete list of winners since the inaugural tournament in 1985 has been published by the organisers and referenced in retrospective tournament records.

== See also ==
- PIPA Snow Polo World Cup Tour
