= 2001 World Polo Championship =

The 2001 World Polo Championship was played in Melbourne Australia during April 2001 and was won by Brazil. This event brought together eight teams from around the world in the Werribee Park.

== Final Match ==
April 2001

Brazil	10–9	Australia

Werribee Park, Melbourne

(Brazil) Luiz Diniz
(Brazil) Aluisio Rosa
(Brazil) Rodrigo Andrade
(Brazil) Olavo Novaes

(Australia) Drew Slack-Smith
(Australia) Andrew Williams
(Australia) Mark Field
(Australia) Damien Johnston

== Final rankings ==
Rank	Team
1	Brazil
2	Australia
3	Argentina
