= 1995 World Polo Championship =

1995 World Polo Championship

Tournament details
- Host country: Switzerland
- Dates: 1995
- Teams: 6

Final positions
- Champions: Brazil (1st title)
- Runners-up: Argentina
- Third place: Mexico

The 1995 World Polo Championship was played in St. Moritz, Switzerland during 1995 and was won by Brazil. This event brought together six teams from around the world.

== Final match ==
1995

Brazil	11–10	Argentina
	Report

St. Moritz Polo Club, Saint Moritz, Switzerland

(Brazil) Olavo Novaez (1)
(Brazil) Ubajara Andrade (5)
(Brazil) Eduardo Junqueira (3)
(Brazil) Luizz C. Figuera de Mello (3)

(Argentina) Gonzalo von Wernicke (3)
(Argentina) Lucas Monteverde (4)
(Argentina) Javier Novillo (5)
(Argentina) Ignacio Figueras (2)

== Final rankings ==
Rank	Team
1	Brazil
2	Argentina
3	Mexico
4	England
