= Destination NSW =

New South Wales state government tourism agency

Agency overview
- Formed: 1 July 2011
- Preceding agencies: Tourism NSW; Events NSW; Homebush Motor Racing Authority; Greater Sydney Partnership
- Jurisdiction: New South Wales
- Minister responsible: John Graham, Minister for Jobs and Tourism
- Agency executive: Steve Cox, Chief Executive Officer
- Parent Department: Department of Creative Industries, Tourism, Hospitality and Sport
- Key document: Destination NSW Act 2011
- Website: www.destinationnsw.com.au

Destination NSW is a New South Wales state government executive agency established in 2011 to support growth of tourism and events in New South Wales, Australia. The agency falls within the Department of Creative Industries, Tourism, Hospitality and Sport of the New South Wales government.

Destination NSW run two consumer-facing websites, sydney.com and VisitNSW, to promote travel to Sydney and NSW both internationally and domestically.

== Governance ==
=== Executive ===
The agency is managed on a daily basis by an executive team led by Steve Cox, the chief executive officer; and is structured into five divisions:

- Engagement and Development
- People and Culture
- Events
- Finance
- Consumer Marketing

=== Board of Management ===
The Chief Executive Officer reports to a Board of Management that is appointed by the Minister. The Board comprises industry representatives with relevant skills and experience in tourism and events. As of December 2024, the Board comprised the following individuals:

- Sally Loane, Chairman
- Anna Guillan AM, Deputy Chair
- Clark Webb
- Emma Hogan
- The Hon. George Souris AM
- Anne Loveridge
- Elizabeth Mildwater, Secretary of the Department of Creative Industries, Tourism, Hospitality and Sport

=== Minister ===
The Board of Destination NSW is responsible to the Minister for Jobs and Tourism. Ultimately, the Minister is responsible to the Parliament of New South Wales.

== Alliances and sponsorships ==
On 23 September 2012 Sydney FC announced it had agreed a sponsorship deal with Destination NSW to promote tourism to Sydney.

Destination NSW is the strategic sponsor of the 2017 World Polo Championship hosted by the Sydney Polo Club. The event will take place in October 2017. It is tournament that will see the world's eight best nations compete for the world title in Sydney's Hawkesbury region.

== Controversy ==
On 12 December 2022, the Australian Professional Leagues (APL), the governing body of the top professional soccer leagues in Australia, announced that they had struck a deal with Destination NSW worth A$15 million to stage the 2023, 2024 and 2025 league finals in Sydney—until that point, each final had been hosted by the competing team with the best league record, regardless of location. The move was met with universal derision and condemnation from clubs and fans, with the APL accused of selling out the sport. After a number of high-profile protests by supporters' groups and prominent individuals in the game, the decision was eventually reversed on 18 October 2023, with the APL instead agreeing to a "Unite Round" (one weekend where all matches are held in the same city) in Sydney in exchange for Destination NSW's financial support. The APL's CEO, Danny Townsend, then resigned on 20 October to take up a new position in the Middle East.

== See also ==
- "Sydney to Me" by Jess & Matt
