= 1989 World Polo Championship =

Sports competition

The 1989 World Polo Championship was played in West Berlin during August 1989 and was won by the United States. This event brought together eight teams from around the world in the St. Moritz Polo Club.

== Final Match ==
August 1989

United States	7–6	England

St. Moritz Polo Club, Berlin

(United States) Julio Arellano
(United States) John Wigdahl
(United States) Charles Bostwick
(United States) Horton Schwartz

(England) Alex Brodie
(England) William Lucas
(England) James Lucas
(England) Jason Dixon

== Final rankings ==
Rank	Team
1	(United States) USA
2	England
3	Argentina
4	Chile
5	Switzerland
6	Germany
7	France
8	Australia
