= Sydney Polo Club =

Polo club in Richmond, Australia

The Sydney Polo Club is a polo club in Richmond, New South Wales, Australia. It is the oldest polo club in the Southern Hemisphere.

The Sydney Polo Club successfully hosted the 2017 World Polo Championship.

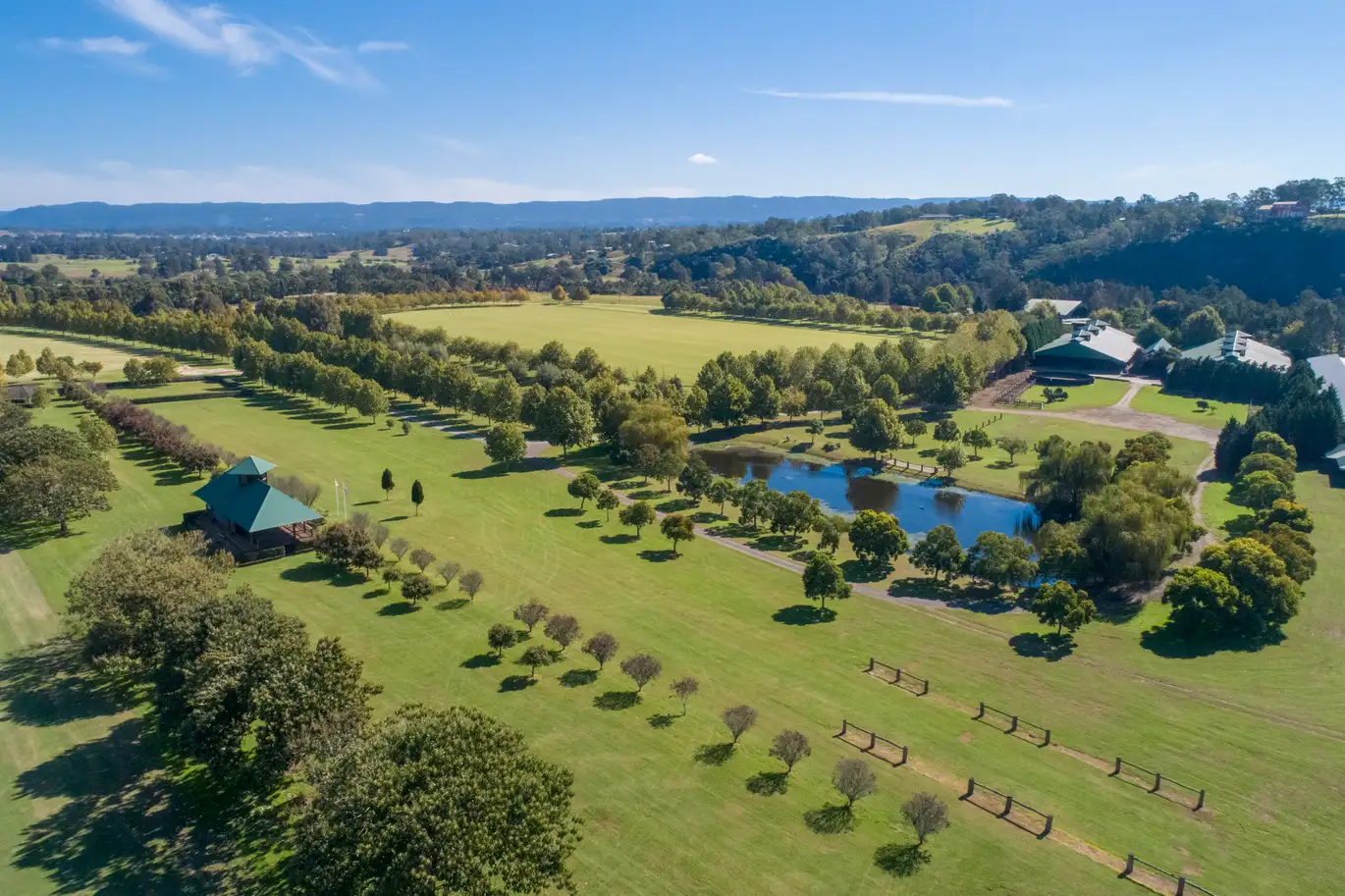
Sydney Polo Club Fields and Arenas

It is the premier polo club for competitive polo in Sydney.

== Location ==
It is located at 100 Ridges Lane, Richmond, New South Wales, 2753, along the Hawkesbury River.

The equestrian facilities include:

- 2 undercover riding arenas
- 38 premium brick horse stables
- Extensive acreage
- Pasture managed paddocks
- Wash Yards
- 3 full size polo fields

== History ==
The Sydney Polo Club was established in the late 1970s by Mr Ken Austin, a well known polo player and contributor to the Australian Polo Council for many years. The Club was based at Menangle Park, NSW.

There was an earlier Club of the same name based in Moore Park NSW, Australia. The first match in Australia took place 23 July 1874 in Moore Park, New South Wales, of which one of the players was Hercules Robinson, 1st Baron Rosmead; it led to the founding of the club. Banjo Paterson (1864-1941), who composed Geelung Polo Club, was an early club member.

Peter Higgins, co-founder of Mortgage Choice (ASX: MOC), and his wife Rebecca Higgins were gifted the name and trophies of the Sydney Polo Club from Ken Austin in the 1990s after Ken Austin's retirement due to illness.

The current Sydney Polo Club is based at Richmond, New South Wales. They have established the annual Sydney Gold Cup.

Sydney Polo Club is home to Riverlands Academy the top learn to play polo school in the country.

== World Polo Championship ==
The Sydney Polo Club is hosting the 2017 World Polo Championship. The Championship rights were awarded to the club itself. This is unusual as the normal process is to award it to a country. The Sydney Polo Club was offered the opportunity to bid because of their unparalleled fields and grounds. The Australian Polo Federation is in support of the Sydney Polo Club. The Championship was run with the support of strategic partner Destination NSW.

Over 100,000 spectators attended the Championship. Argentina beat Chile in the final.

Bronze: England

Silver: Chile

Gold: Argentina

== Popular culture ==
Sydney Polo Club is a popular film and shoot location in Australia.

- In 2013, the opening scene of The Great Gatsby was filmed at the Sydney polo club.
- Peter Rabbit 2
- Episodes from multiple seasons of The Bachelor Australia including Episode #2.2,#4.10, #5.4
- Episodes from multiple seasons of The Bachelorette Australia including Episode #3.5
- Episodes from multiple seasons of Married at First Sight
- Episodes from multiple seasons of Farmer Wants a Wife
- Mr Inbetween season 2
