= 1987 World Polo Championship =

The 1987 World Polo Championship was the first edition of the event and was played in Buenos Aires, Argentina in April 1987. Argentina was declared the winner having won the most matches in the round robin tournament. This event brought together five teams from around the world to the Campo Argentino de Polo.

== Final Match ==
April 1987

Argentina	14–14	Mexico

Campo Argentino de Polo, Buenos Aires

(Argentina) Diego Dodero
(Argentina) Martin Vidou
(Argentina) Esteban Panelo
(Argentina) Bautista Heguy

(Mexico) J. Celis
(Mexico) A. Gonzalez Gracida
(Mexico) V. Aguilar
(Mexico) M. Nava Ayon

In this first World Polo Championship all the teams played one game against each other. In the game between Argentina and Mexico the score was tied at 14 all. Argentina had won more games overall and therefore was the winner of the World Championship I and Mexico was second having won the next largest number of games in the tournament.

== Final rankings ==
Rank	Team
1	Argentina
2	Mexico
3	Brazil
4	Spain
5	Australia
