= Campo Argentino de Polo =

Multi-purpose stadium in Buenos Aires, Argentina

Coordinates: 34°34′17.35″S 58°25′37.09″W

Argentine Polo Ground
- Campo Argentino de Polo
- Cathedral of Polo
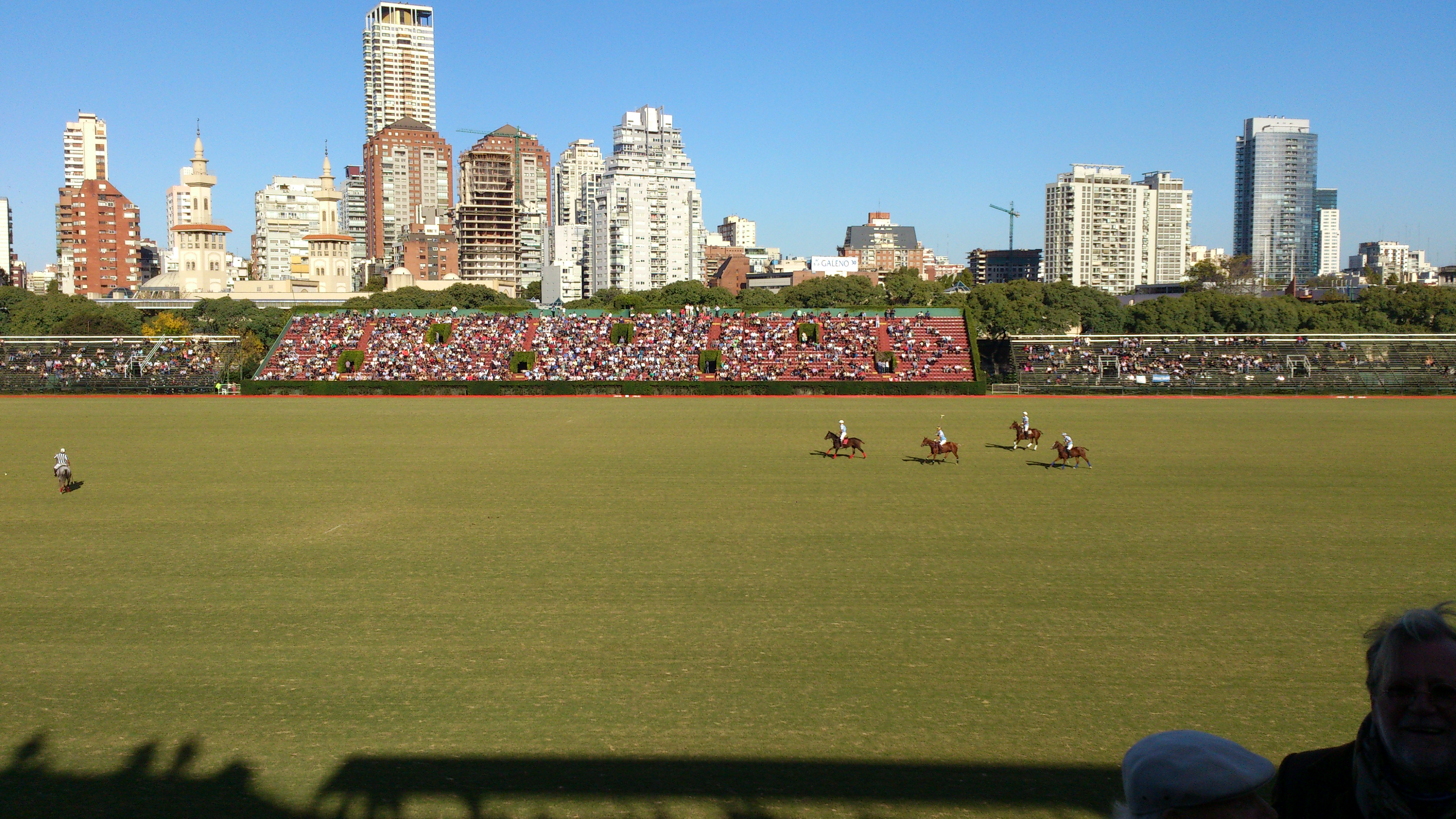
- The Campo Argentino during a polo match in 2014
- Interactive map of Argentine Polo Ground
- Address: Avenida del Libertador and Avenida Dorrego
- Location: Palermo, Buenos Aires, Argentina
- Owner: Argentine Army
- Operator: Argentine Polo Association
- Capacity: 30,000
- Type: Stadium
- Events: Sport events Music concerts
- Surface: Grass
- Public transit: Mitre Line at 3 de Febrero railway station at Ministro Carranza or Palermo (within walking distance)

Construction
- Opened: October 27, 1928; 97 years ago

The Campo Argentino del Polo (Argentine Polo Ground), popularly known as The Cathedral of Polo, is a multi-purpose stadium in Buenos Aires, Argentina. It is currently used mostly for polo, pato and field hockey matches.

The stadium, opened in 1928, holds up to 30,000 people and is located in the Palermo neighbourhood, on Del Libertador Avenue, close to Hipódromo Argentino.

This is a unique polo field, situated ten minutes away from downtown Buenos Aires, and is considered the most modern and comfortable for spectators in the sport. The Campo Argentino, is the home to the Campeonato Argentino Abierto de Polo, the most important polo event in the world, held there since 1928. It is organized by the Asociación Argentina de Polo.

== History ==
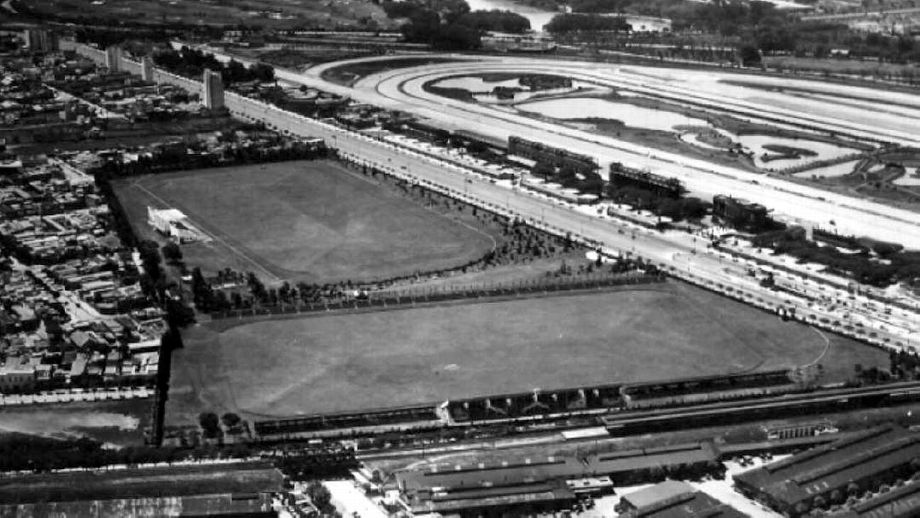
The Campo Argentino in 1940

The Campo Argentino was erected on the same land where the Sociedad Sportiva Argentina stadium had been located since its establishment in 1899 until its expropriation from the Government of Argentina in 1914, when the National Army took over the stadium after the second period of five years (counting from 1909) came to an end. Ten years later, the Ministry of War led by Agustín P. Justo expropriated the lands and transferred them to the Army, which is its owner since then.

After taking the lands, the Army built two polo fields (known as "canchas 1 y 2"). The Campo Argentino was officially inaugurated on October 27, 1928, with a match between civilian and military teams (named "Civiles" and "Militares" respectively). The Army has rented Campo Argentino to the Argentine Polo Association since then.

In 1978, the Campo Argentino was the venue for all the matches of the World Field Hockey Cup, won by Pakistan. A total of seven hockey fields were specially prepared on the canchas 1 and 2 for the occasion.

Defunct competition America's Polo Cup ("Copa de las Américas") took place in Campo Argentino on numerous occasions. In this classic match, the best team from Argentina played against the best one from the United States.

The stadium has been also used for music concerts. Metallica, Oasis, Jamiroquai, Santana, Shakira, Neil Young, R.E.M., Beck, Backstreet Boys, Luciano Pavarotti, Luis Miguel, Ed Sheeran, Paul McCartney, The Pretenders and Phil Collins are some of the artists who have performed at Campo Argentino.

=== List of concerts ===
Date	Performer(s)	Tour/Event	Supporting act
26 February 1995	Luciano Pavarotti	---	---
12 May 2000	Shakira	Tour Anfibio	---
16 January 2001	Oasis, R.E.M., Beck, Neil Young & The Crazy Horse	Buenos Aires Hot Festival	---
17 January 2001	Oasis, R.E.M., Beck, Neil Young & The Crazy Horse	Buenos Aires Hot Festival	---
18 January 2001	Oasis, R.E.M., Beck, Neil Young & The Crazy Horse	Buenos Aires Hot Festival	---
2 March 2002	Chayanne	Tour 2002	---
9 March 2006	Santana	2006 Tour	Memphis La Blusera
10 March 2006	Oasis	Don't Believe the Truth Tour	Turf
20 March 2018	Phil Collins	Not Dead Yet Tour	The Pretenders, Hilda Lizarazu
5 October 2018	Ricardo Arjona	Circo Soledad Tour	---
23 February 2019	Ed Sheeran	Divide Tour	Passenger
1 March 2019	Luis Miguel	México Por Siempre Tour	---
2 March 2019	Luis Miguel	México Por Siempre Tour	---
23 March 2019	Paul McCartney	Freshen Up	Victoria Bernardi
7 March 2020	Backstreet Boys	DNA World Tour	---
18 December 2021	Soda Stereo	Gracias Totales - Soda Stereo	---
19 December 2021	Soda Stereo	Gracias Totales - Soda Stereo	---
8 April 2022	Maroon 5	2020 Tour	DJ Noah Passovoy, Zoe Gotusso
23 April 2022	Kiss	End of the Road World Tour	---
30 April 2022	Metallica	Metallica 2021–2022 Tour	Greta Van Fleet
13 September 2022	Dua Lipa	Future Nostalgia Tour	Vickilicious
14 September 2022	Dua Lipa	Future Nostalgia Tour	Vickilicious
22 December 2022	TINI	Tini Tour 2022-2023	---
23 December 2022	TINI	Tini Tour 2022-2023	---
9 March 2023	Imagine Dragons	Mercury World Tour	---
6 March 2024	Luis Miguel	Luis Miguel Tour 2023–24	--
9 March 2024	Luis Miguel	Luis Miguel Tour 2023–24	--
10 March 2024	Luis Miguel	Luis Miguel Tour 2023–24	--
17 December 2024	Luis Miguel	Luis Miguel Tour 2023–24	--
18 December 2024	Luis Miguel	Luis Miguel Tour 2023–24	--
7 March 2025	Shakira	Las Mujeres Ya No Lloran World Tour	---
8 March 2025	Shakira	Las Mujeres Ya No Lloran World Tour	---

== See also ==
- Sociedad Sportiva Argentina

Preceded by Kuala Lumpur	Men's Hockey World Cup; Final Venue; 1978	Succeeded by Mumbai
Preceded by None	World Polo Championship; Venue; 1987	Succeeded by Mailfeld; Berlin
