= Hurlingham Polo Association =

Sports governing body

- Sport: Polo
- Abbreviation: HPA
- Founded: 1925
- Affiliation: Federation of International Polo
- Chairman: William Lucas
- CEO: Anna Hall
- Replaced: Hurlingham Polo Committee
- (founded): 1875

Official website
- www.hpa-polo.co.uk

The Hurlingham Polo Association (HPA) is the governing body for polo in the United Kingdom, Ireland, the United Arab Emirates and a number of other countries. The Federation of International Polo produces the International Rules of Polo through a cooperative agreement with the Hurlingham Polo Association, the Asociacion Argentina de Polo, and the United States Polo Association.

Within its jurisdiction, the Hurlingham Polo Association is responsible for implementing the rules of polo and for disciplining players who commit infractions against these rules. It also designates handicaps for each of the 2,500 or so players in the UK. It drew up the first set of formal British rules in 1875, many of which are still in existence.

== History ==
The association originated as the Hurlingham Polo Committee in 1875 (which drew up the first English rules). The Hurlingham Polo Committee was re-titled as the Hurlingham Club Polo Committee and expanded to include representatives on the council from the Services, the County Polo Association (formed in 1898 to look after the interests of the country clubs and to run the County Cup Tournaments), the three London polo clubs – Hurlingham, Ranelagh and Roehampton – and from all associations within the Empire where polo was being played in 1903. Later, in 1925, the Hurlingham Club Polo Committee was re-designated as the Hurlingham Polo Association.

== See also ==
- Australian Polo Federation
- Federation of International Polo
