= 2011 World Polo Championship =

2011 World Polo Championship

Tournament details
- Host country: Chile
- Dates: October 2011
- Teams: 10

Final positions
- Champions: Argentina (4th title)
- Runners-up: Brazil
- Third place: Italy States

The 2011 World Polo Championship was played in Estancia Grande (San Luis), Argentina during October 2011 and was won by Argentina. This event brought together ten teams from around the world: Argentina, Australia, Brazil, Chile, England, India, Italy, Mexico, Pakistan and the United States.

== Final Match ==
October 2011

Argentina	12–11	Brazil

Estancia Grande (San Luis) Argentina

(Argentina) Pablo Llorente
(Argentina) Alfredo Capella
(Argentina) Martín Inchauspe
(Argentina) Salvador Jauretche

(Brazil) Beto Junqueira
(Brazil) Pedro Zacharias
(Brazil) Xande Junqueira
(Brazil) Joao Novaes

== Final rankings ==
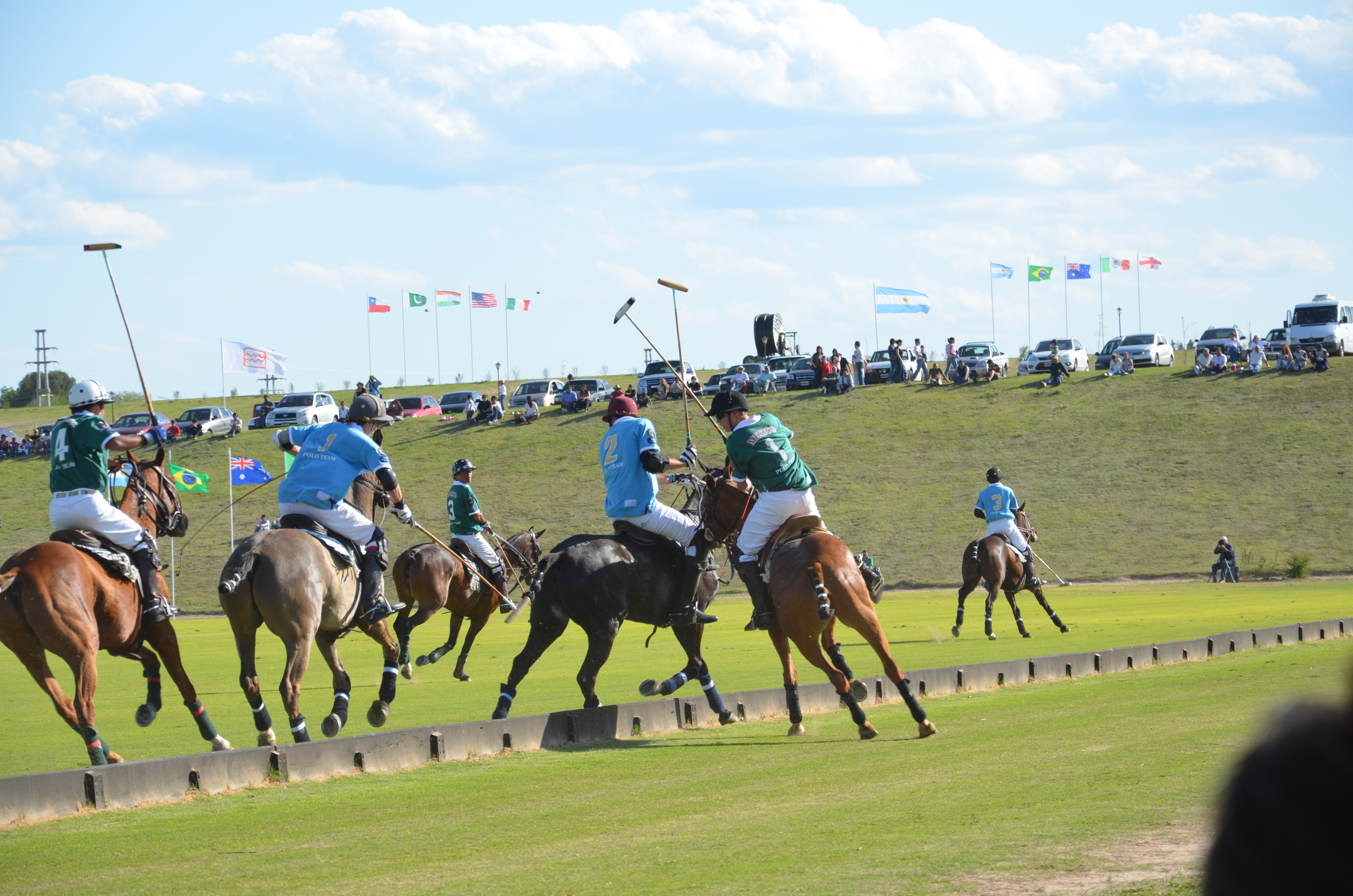
A match between Argentina and Mexico at the 2011 World Polo Championships

Rank	Team	Riders
1	Argentina	Pablo Llorente, Alfredo Capella, Martin Inchauspe, Salvador Jauretche
2	Brazil	Beto Junqueira, Pedro Zacharias, Xande Junqueira, Joao Novaes
3	Italy	
4	England	
