= 2004 World Polo Championship =

The 2004 World Polo Championship was played in Chantilly (France) during September 2004 and was won by Brazil. Brazil got its third World Polo Championship. This event brought together nine teams from around the world in the Polo Club du Domaine.

== Matches ==
Semifinals
Brazil | 9
France | 3
England | 7
Chile | 6

Finals
Brazil | 10
England | 9
