= 2022 World Polo Championship =

2022 World Polo Championship

Tournament details
- Host country: United States
- Dates: 29 October – 6 November 2022
- Teams: 8

Final positions
- Champions: Spain (1st title)
- Runners-up: United States
- Third place: Uruguay

The 2022 World Polo Championship was the 12th edition of the polo tournament for national teams. Spain clinched a win in overtime against the USA, 11-10. It was held from October 26 to November 6 and featured eight teams with up to 14 goals of handicap.

It was originally scheduled to be held in October 2021 at the Empire Polo Club in Indio, California. The event was postponed to 2022 due to the COVID-19 pandemic and the venue changed to the Valiente Polo Farm and International Polo Club Palm Beach in Wellington, Florida.

The previous winner Argentina and host country the United States automatically qualified with the remaining six teams competing in qualifications matches.

== Countries ==
The tournament was held in Florida, United States from 29 October – 6 November and included the following teams: Argentina, Australia, Italy, Mexico, Pakistan, Spain, the United States and Uruguay. The initial group games were played at VPF-Valiente Polo Farm and the opening ceremony, semifinals and final were held at the National Polo Center, Wellington, Florida.

== Qualifying zones ==
- Zone A – North and Central America
- Zone B – South America
- Zone C – Europe
- Zone D – Asia and Oceania
- Zone E – Africa, Pakistan and India

== Fixture and Results ==
=== Pool Stage ===
Results

Date	Group	Team 1	Team 2	Score
October 29	Zone A	Argentina	Mexico	10–4½
October 29	Zone A	Spain	Pakistan	9–7½
October 29	Zone B	Uruguay	Italy	9–3½
October 29	Zone B	United States	Australia	9–4
October 31	Group A	Argentina	Pakistan	13–1½
October 31	Group A	Spain	Mexico	11–4½
October 31	Group B	Uruguay	Australia	9–7½
October 31	Group B	Italy	United States	6–4
November 2	Group A	Argentina	Spain	6–3½
November 2	Group B	United States	Uruguay	7½–7
November 2	Group B	Italy	Australia	8½–5
November 5	Group A	Pakistan	Mexico	11–8

=== Knockout matches ===
Semifinals
United States	9
Argentina	8
Spain	10.5
Uruguay	7

Finals
United States	10
Spain	11
Bronze
Argentina	7.5
Uruguay	9

== Final ==
November 9, 2022

Spain	11–10	United States
	Report

National Polo Center, Wellington, Florida

(Spain) Nicholas Ruiz Guiñazu
(Spain) Luis Domnecq Carrión
(Spain) Pelayo Berazadi Rózpide
(Spain) Nicolas Álvarez Cervera

(United States) Agustin Arellano
(United States) Lucas Escobar
(United States) Nico Escobar
(United States) Hope Arellano

== Final rankings ==
Rank	Team
1	Spain
2	United States
3	Uruguay
4	Argentina
