= World Polo Championship =

Polo tournament

- Current season, competition or edition: 2027 World Polo Championship
- Sport: Polo
- Founded: 1987
- No. of teams: 8 (Finals)
- Continent: International (FIP)
- Most recent champion: Spain (1st title)
- Most titles: Argentina (5 titles)

The World Polo Championship is an international polo competition between countries. The event is organised by the sport's governing body, the Federation of International Polo (FIP), and is contested by the national teams. There is no restriction on the gender of the players. The inaugural tournament was held in 1987, hosted by Argentina, and is now contested every three or four years.

== History ==
In the early 1980s, motivated by a desire to broaden the scope of international polo, as well as to restore the sport's Olympic status, Marcos Uranga, then President of the Argentine Polo Association, proposed that an international organization be formed among the polo-playing countries of the world. The initial meetings took place in Buenos Aires, and by April 1982, the Federation of International Polo, quickly known as “FIP,” was created. FIP's first President was Marcos Uranga.

Mr. Uranga spearheaded the movement for a World Championship and scheduled the first for April 1987 in the Campo Argentino de Polo in Buenos Aires, Argentina. Aware of the relative difficulty of fielding high-goal teams worldwide, the early FIP organizers wisely decided to limit competition to teams rated 10 to 14 goals. In an attempt to nullify the factor of the horses, they devised the then-revolutionary idea of split strings of horses – assigning matched strings of 28 horses to each team by the luck of the draw.

In 1989, the second FIP World Championship was played in Berlin, at Maifeld, the very stadium that had been the site of polo's last appearance in the Olympic Games. The sport had come full-circle, and it underlined the growing influence of FIP in the world polo community. Argentina, Australia, Chile, England, France, Germany, Switzerland and the United States competed in the tournament's second edition. A talented USA team beat England 7–6 in the final. The USA team players were: Horton Schwartz, Julio Arellano, Charley Bostwick and John Wigdahl who scored the winning goal in the sixth chukker. The resulting publicity raised the visibility of the FIP among U.S. polo players.

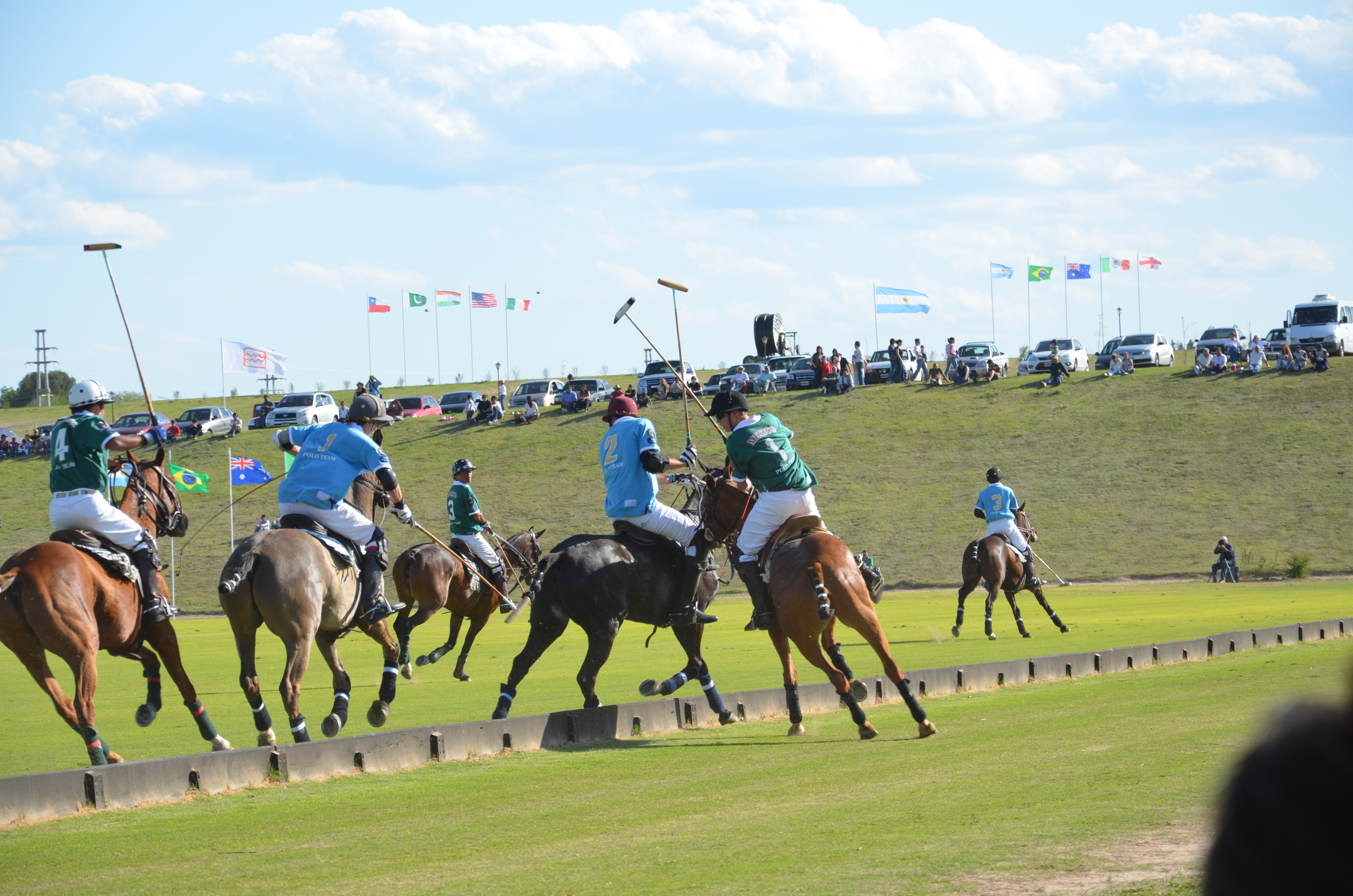
A match between Argentina and Mexico at the 2011 World Polo Championships

The FIP World Championship III was held in Santiago, Chile in 1992. Argentina outscored the host country 12–7 in the final securing their second World Championship. England beat the US for bronze.

Starting in 1993 Michael Schultz-Tholen, then the FIP delegate to the International Olympic Committee, arranged numerous meetings with IOC representatives including the President of the International Olympic Committee Mr. Juan Antonio Samaranch. Finally at the 1996 Atlanta Olympic Games, the General Assembly of the International Olympic Committee granted the status of an IOC Recognized Sport and accepted the Federation of International Polo as the worldwide governing body for the sport of polo. This decision was confirmed ("outright recognition") two years later.

In 1995, the fourth World Championship was held in Saint Moritz, Switzerland. Brazil fought its way gamely through the early rounds and met Argentina in the final where they pulled off an exciting 11–10 victory to assume the mantle of World Polo Champions.

In 1998, the fifth World Championship was held at the Santa Barbara Polo & Racquet Club in Santa Barbara, California. Mr. James Easton, a member of the International Olympic Committee, presented Argentina, the winning team, with a history-making Olympic trophy. This was the first time in 62 years that the winning team of an international polo tournament was so honored.

The FIP World Championship VI held in Melbourne, Australia in 2001 featured eight national teams that qualified through a demanding and highly competitive zone playoff system, which included 24 international teams. Brazil narrowly defeated Australia by one goal (Brazil 10, Australia 9) in the final.

In 2004, the Sixth World Championship was held in Chantilly, France. The tournament included eight teams. 28 countries competed in the qualifying rounds. All of the games were competitive. Brazil defeated England in the final (10–9) in sudden death.

The eighth edition of the World Polo Championship took place in Mexico during May 2008 and was won by Chile.

The ninth edition of the World Polo Championship took place in San Luis Province, Argentina during October 2011. Argentina defeated Brazil in the final and Italy took the third place after defeating England. It was the first time in World Polo Championship that Italy achieved a podium finish.

The tenth edition of the World Polo Championship took place in Santiago, Chile during March and April 2015. The hosts won beating the United States 12–11 in overtime in the final.

In the 2017 World Polo Championship Argentina beat Chile in the final securing their fifth title.

In the twelfth edition of the Championship, Spain clinched an 11–10 win in overtime against the US for their first ever title.

== Results (Grass Polo) ==
=== Men ===
#	Year	Host	Champion	2nd	3rd	Ref.
1	1987	Buenos Aires, Argentina	Argentina	Mexico	Brazil	
2	1989	Berlin, Germany	United States	England	Argentina	
3	1992	Santiago, Chile	Argentina	Chile	England	
4	1995	St. Moritz, Switzerland	Brazil	Argentina	Mexico	
5	1998	Santa Barbara, United States	Argentina	Brazil	England	
6	2001	Melbourne, Australia	Brazil	Australia	Argentina	
7	2004	Chantilly, France	Brazil	England	Chile	
8	2008	Mexico City, Mexico	Chile	Brazil	Mexico	
9	2011	San Luis Province, Argentina	Argentina	Brazil	Italy	
10	2015	Santiago, Chile	Chile	United States	Brazil	
11	2017	Sydney, Australia	Argentina	Chile	England	
12	2022	Wellington, United States	Spain	United States	Uruguay	
13	2027	Punta del Este, Uruguay				

=== Women ===
#	Year	Host	Champion	2nd	3rd	Ref.
1	2022	Campo Argentino de Polo, Buenos Aires Argentina	Argentina	United States	England	

== Medals ==
=== Men (1987–2022) ===
Rank	Nation	Gold	Silver	Bronze	Total
1	Argentina	5	1	2	8
2	Brazil	3	3	2	8
3	Chile	2	2	1	5
4	United States	1	2	0	3
5	Spain	1	0	0	1
6	England	0	2	3	5
7	Mexico	0	1	2	3
8	Australia	0	1	0	1
9	Italy	0	0	1	1
9	Uruguay	0	0	1	1
Totals (10 entries)		12	12	12	36

=== Women (2022) ===
Rank	Nation	Gold	Silver	Bronze	Total
1	Argentina	1	0	0	1
2	United States	0	1	0	1
3	England	0	0	1	1
Totals (3 entries)		1	1	1	3

== Ranking ==
Pos.	Team	Champion	Runners-up	Third	Fourth
1st	Argentina	5 (1987, 1992, 1998, 2011, 2017)	1 (1995)	2 (1989, 2001)	1 (2022)
2nd	Brazil	3 (1995, 2001, 2004)	3 (1998, 2008, 2011)	2 (1987, 2015)	–
3rd	Chile	2 (2008, 2015)	2 (1992, 2017)	1 (2004)	1 (1989)
4th	United States	1 (1989)	2 (2015, 2022)	–	3 (1992, 1998, 2017)
5th	Spain	1 (2022)	–	–	2 (1987, 2008)
6th	England	–	2 (1989, 2004)	3 (1992, 1998, 2017)	4 (1995, 2001, 2011, 2015)
7th	Mexico	–	1 (1987)	2 (1995, 2008)	–
8th	Australia	–	1 (2001)	–	–
9th	Italy	–	–	1 (2011)	–
10th	Uruguay	–	–	1 (2022)	–
11th	France	–	–	–	1 (2004)

== Nations ==
Country	1987	1989	1992	1995	1998	2001	2004	2008	2011	2015	2017	2022
Argentina	1st	3rd	1st	2nd	1st	3rd	P. round	–	1st	P. round	1st	4th
Australia	5th	P. round	–	–	P. round	2nd	1st round	–	P. round	–	P. round	P. round
Brazil	3rd	–	–	1st	2nd	1st	1st	2nd	2nd	3rd	–	–
Canada	–	–	–	–	–	P. round	–	P. round	–	–	–	–
Chile	–	4th	2nd	–	–	–	3rd	1st	P. round	1st	2nd	–
England	–	2nd	3rd	4th	3rd	4th	2nd	P. round	4th	4th	3rd	–
France	–	P. round	–	–	–	–	4th	–	–	–	–	–
Germany	–	P. round	–	–	–	–	–	–	–	–	–	–
Guatemala	–	–	P. round	–	P. round	–	–	–	–	–	–	–
India	–	–	–	P. round	–	P. round	–	–	P. round	–	P. round	–
Italy	–	–	–	–	–	P. round	–	–	3rd	–	–	P. round
Mexico	2nd	–	P. round	3rd	–	–	1st round	3rd	P. round	–	–	P. round
New Zealand	–	–	–	–	–	–	–	P. round	–	–	P. round	–
Pakistan	–	–	–	–	–	–	P. round	–	P. round	P. round	–	P. round
South Africa	–	–	–	–	–	–	–	P. round	–	–	–	–
Spain	4th	–	–	–	–	–	–	4th	–	–	P. round	1st
Switzerland	–	P. round	–	P. round	–	–	–	–	–	–	–	–
United States	–	1st	4th	–	4th	P. round	P. round	–	P. round	2nd	4th	2nd
Uruguay	–	–	–	–	–	–	–	–	–	–	–	3rd

== Results (FIP Arena Polo World Cup) ==
=== Men ===
#	Year	Host	Champion	2nd	3rd	Ref.
1	2022	Buenos Aires, Argentina	France	United States	Argentina	
2	2025	Crozet, Virginia, United States	United States	Argentina	France	

== See also ==
- Federation of International Polo
- Polo handicap
- Polo at the Summer Olympics
- Polo at the Pan American Games
- Polo at the 2007 Southeast Asian Games
- Polo at the 2017 Southeast Asian Games
- Polo at the 2019 Southeast Asian Games
- PIPA Snow Polo World Cup Tour
- PIPA Beach Polo World Series
