= San Diego Polo Club =

Polo club in Rancho Santa Fe

San Diego Polo Club is a polo club in Rancho Santa Fe in San Diego County, California. It was founded in 1986. The club is situated on 80 acres of land, offering five polo fields. It includes an exercise track, riding trails, a clubhouse and bar, a polo training school, and an outdoor lighted arena.
