= 2008 World Polo Championship =

2008 World Polo Championship

Tournament details
- Host country: Mexico
- Dates: April 24 – May 3 2008
- Teams: 8

Final positions
- Champions: Chile (1st title)
- Runners-up: Brazil
- Third place: Mexico

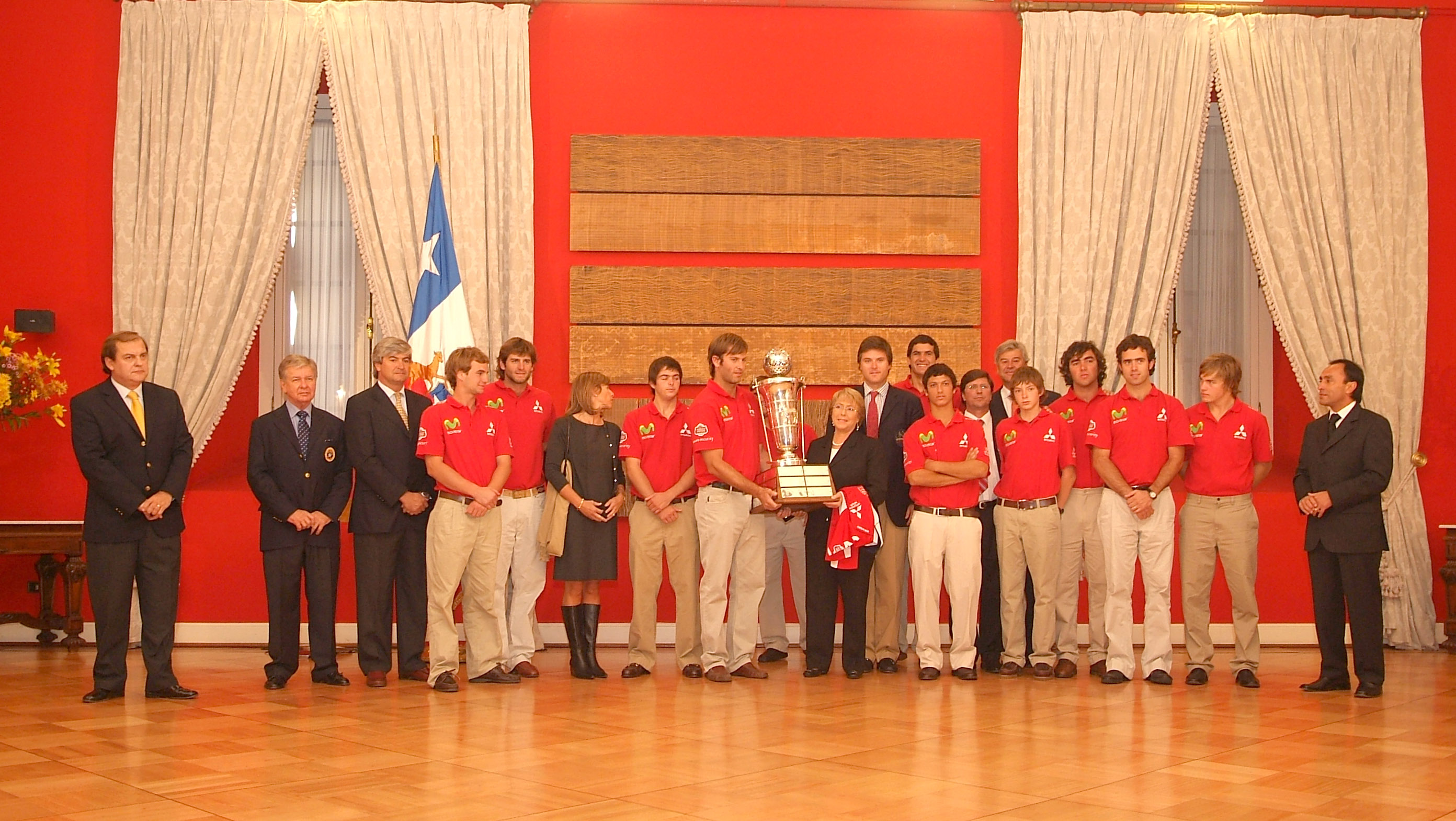
The Chilean team with President Michelle Bachelet after they won the trophy of the 2008 World Polo Championship.

The 2008 World Polo Championship was the eighth edition of the competition and took place in Mexico during April and May 2008. Chile beat Brazil in the final.

== Background ==
The event brought together eight teams from around the world to the Campo Marte in the Mexican capital and the Tecamac Polo Club.

The participating nationes included the following: Brazil, as reigning world champion in the category; Mexico, as host country, Canada, New Zealand, England, South Africa, Spain and Chile.

Mexico secured hosting rights due to the work of entrepreneur Pablo Rincón Gallardo Corcuera, Avila Camacho and Eduardo Sólorzano Barrón.

== Fixture and results ==
=== Pool results ===
April 24, 2008
England	5–7	Brazil	09:30 UTC-7
New Zealand	5–3.5	Canada	11:15 UTC-7
Spain	5–6	Chile	13:30 UTC-7
Mexico	9–5	South Africa	15:15 UTC-7
April 26, 2008
Mexico	9–8	England	12:00 UTC-7
April 27, 2008
Spain	9–7.5	New Zealand	10:00 UTC-7
Chile	8–6	Canada	11:45 UTC-7
South Africa	6–7	Brazil	13:30 UTC-7
April 29, 2008
Canada	6–9	Spain	09:30 UTC-7
Chile	14.5–6	New Zealand	11:15 UTC-7
Brazil	8–5	Mexico	13:30 UTC-7
England	4–4.5	South Africa	15:15 UTC-7

=== Knockout stages ===
Semi-finals
May 1, 2008
Spain	5
Brazil	7
May 1, 2008
Chile	10
Mexico	9

Final
May 3, 2008
Brazil	9
Chile	11
Third place
May 3, 2008
Spain	12
Mexico	13
