= Villa a Sesta =

- Frazione
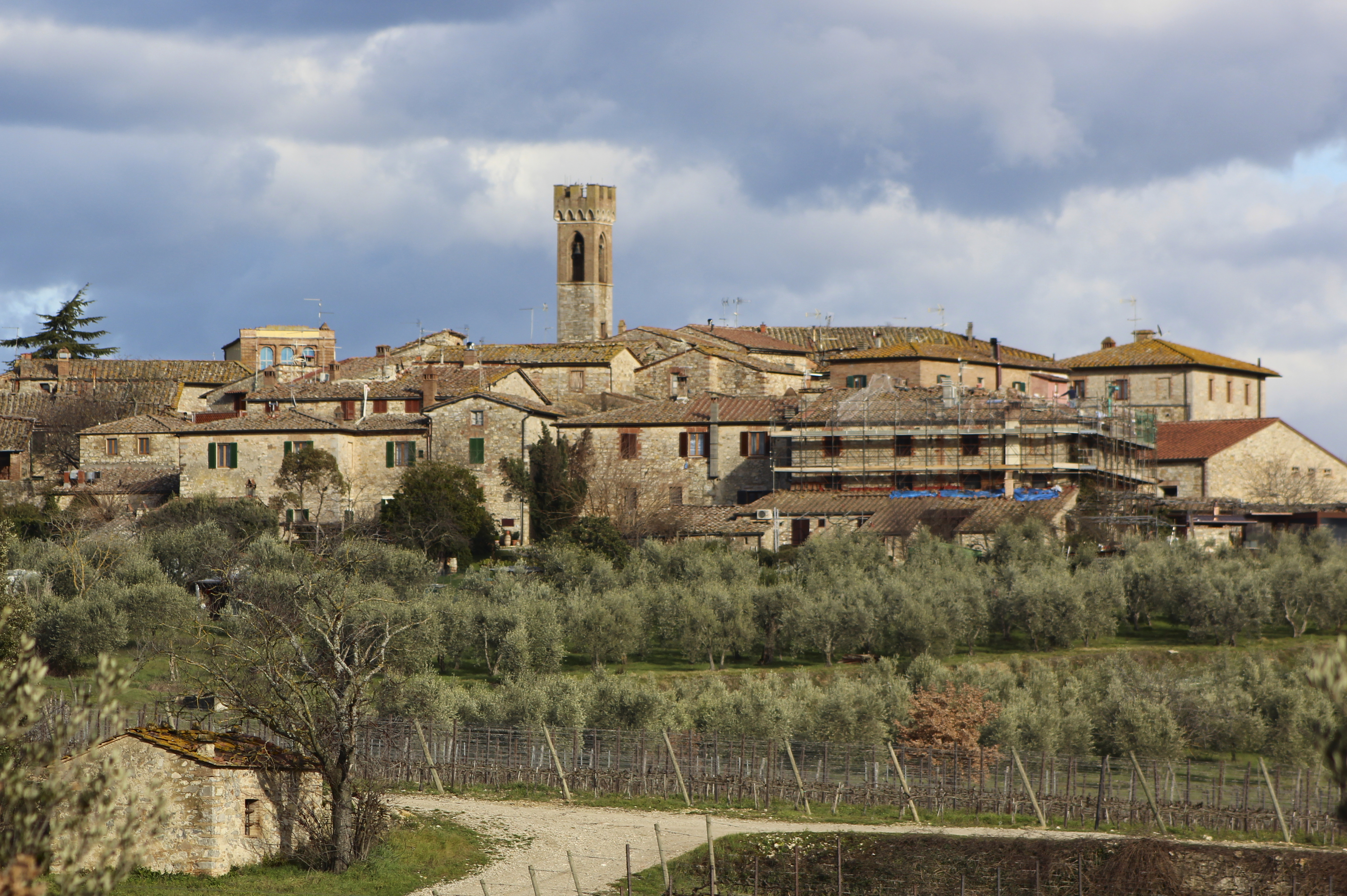
- View of Villa a Sesta

- Location of Villa a Sesta in Italy
- Coordinates: 43°23′11″N 11°28′54″E
- Country: Italy
- Region: Tuscany
- Province: Siena (SI)
- Comune: Castelnuovo Berardenga
- Elevation: 426 m (1,398 ft)

Population (2011)
  - Total: 129
- Time zone: UTC+1 (CET)
  - Summer (DST): UTC+2 (CEST)

Villa a Sesta is a village in Tuscany, central Italy, administratively a frazione of the comune of Castelnuovo Berardenga, province of Siena. At the time of the 2001 census its population was 103.

Villa a Sesta is about 24 km from Siena and 6 km from Castelnuovo Berardenga.
