= 2015 World Polo Championship =

2015 World Polo Championship

Tournament details
- Host country: Chile
- Dates: 27 March – 1 April 2015
- Teams: 6

Final positions
- Champions: Chile (5th title)
- Runners-up: United States
- Third place: Brazil

Tournament statistics
- Matches played: 10

The World Polo Championship 2015, tenth edition, took place in Santiago, Chile during March and April 2015 and was won by the host, beating the United States in the final.

This event brought together six teams from around the world in the Club de Polo y Equitación San Cristóbal of the Chilean capital.

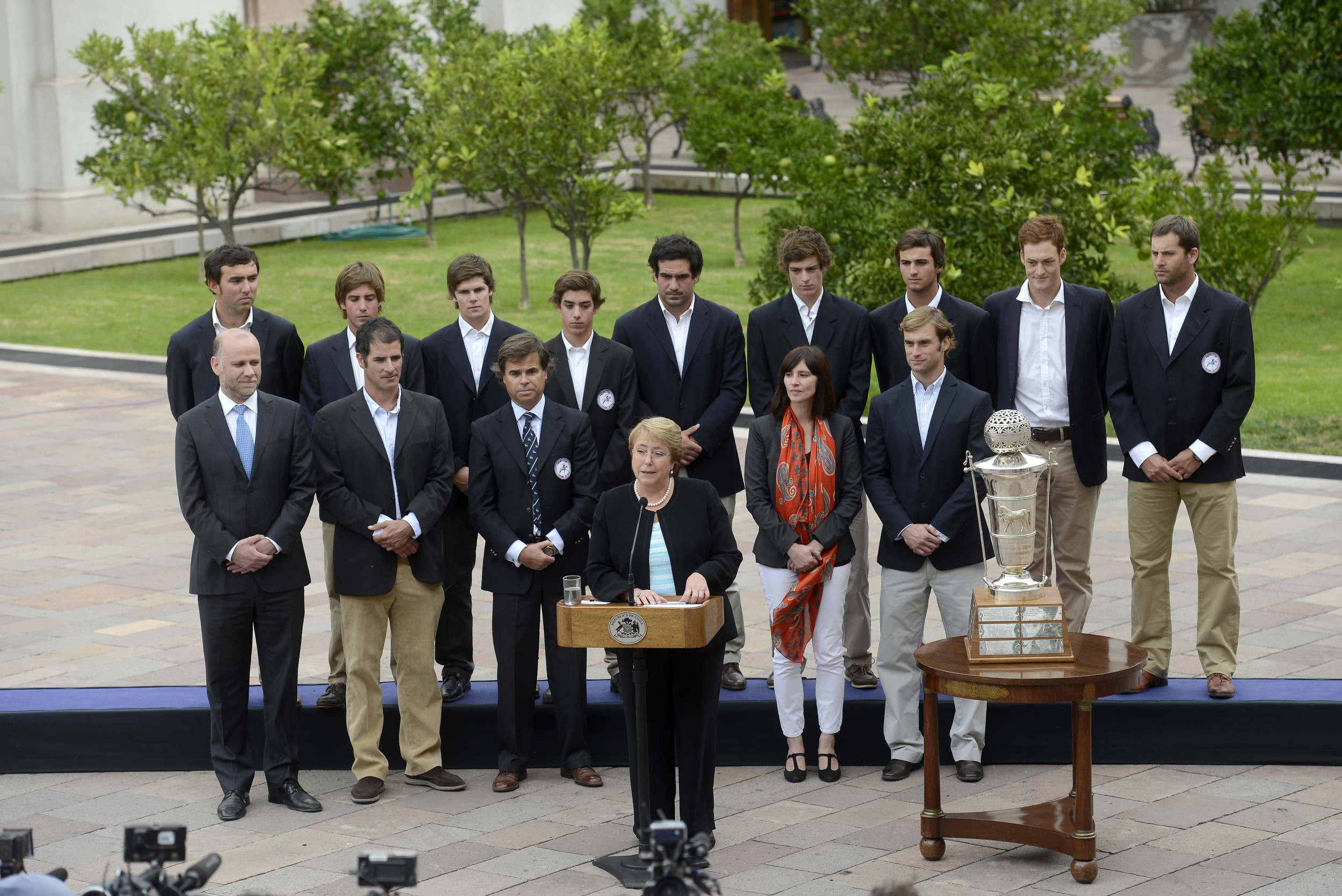
The Chilean president Michelle Bachelet congratulates the Chilean team following their 2015 victory in the World Polo Championships

== Fixture and Results ==
Pool Results

P. Round

Results

Date	Group	Team 1	Team 2	Score
March 27	Group A	Chile	England	10–9
March 27	Group B	Argentina	Brazil	8–9
March 28	Group A	England	Pakistan	13–6
March 28	Group B	United States	Argentina	11–10
March 29	Group A	Pakistan	Chile	10–11
March 29	Group B	Brazil	United States	7–9

=== Knockout stages ===
Semi-finals
Mar 31, 2015
Chile	11
Brazil	10
Mar 31, 2015
England	9
United States	15

Final
Apr 1, 2015
Chile	12
United States	11
Third place
Apr 1, 2015
England	12
Brazil	14

== Final ==
April 1, 2015

Chile	12–11 (a.e.t.)	United States
	Report

San Cristobal Polo Club, Santiago

(Chile)
(Chile)
(Chile)
(Chile)

(United States) Remy Muller
(United States) Jesse Bray
(United States) Felipe Viana
(United States) Patrick Uretz
