= Argentine Polo Association =

Sports governing body in Argentina

- Founded: September 14, 1922
- Affiliation: Federation of International Polo
- Headquarters: Arévalo 3065 Buenos Aires, Argentina

The Argentine Polo Association (Spanish: Asociación Argentina de Polo, AAP) is the guiding entity of the game of Polo in the Argentina. It is a non-profit association constituted on September 14, 1922 in Buenos Aires.

Before its creation the Polo Association of the River Plate (the P.A.R.P) was the governing body for polo in Argentina. However in 1921, a group of players formed the Argentine Polo Federation with the intent on sending teams abroad to compete internationally, an idea opposed by the P.A.R.P. When the teams sent to England and the United States by the Argentine Polo Federation were successful, it appeared that clubs and players would defect from the P.A.R.P. to join the Federation. The P.A.R.P. agreed to negotiations in 1922. The negotiations took place between Francisco Ceballos and Miguel Martinzes de Hoz of the Argentine Polo Federation and Ernest Jewell and Joseph Monroe Hinds of the P.A.R.P. Finally at a meeting at the Hurlingham Club on September 14, 1922, twenty-seven club delegates signed the founding document of the AAP. The first President was Joseph Monroe Hinds, and first Vice-President was Francisco Ceballos.

The association is headquartered in Buenos Aires and is headed by the Board of Directors, which is made up of a president, a vice president and thirteen directors. The current president is Eduardo Novillo Astrada (h). Several subcommissions are configured to fulfill the tasks.

The AAP organizes the most important polo tournament in the world, the Campeonato Argentino Abierto de Polo, which is played in the Campo Argentino de Polo in Buenos Aires. The AAP also oversees the remaining polo tournaments in Argentina, establishes the rules for polo in Argentina and is responsible for interpretation in case of doubt, imposes disciplinary measures and decides on the handicap of players active in Argentina.

The AAP is affiliated with the Federation of International Polo (FIP), the global polo governing body and the Argentine Olympic Committee.
