= 1992 World Polo Championship =

The 1992 World Polo Championship was played in Santiago Chile during April 1992 and was won by Argentina. This event brought together six teams from around the world in the Club de Polo y Equitación San Cristóbal.

== Final Match ==
April 12, 1992

Argentina	12–7	Chile

Club de Polo y Equitación San Cristóbal, Santiago

(Argentina) Lucas Criado
(Argentina) Delfin Uranga
(Argentina) Facundo Bensadon
(Argentina) Patricio Garrahan

(Chile) Jaime Garcia Huidobro
(Chile) Jaime Arrau
(Chile) Rodrigo Vial
(Chile) José Rebolar

== Final rankings ==
Rank	Team
1	Argentina
2	Chile
3	England
4	(United States) USA
5	Mexico
6	Guatemala
