= PIPA Beach Polo World Series =

The PIPA Beach Polo World Series is an international series of beach polo tournaments organized by PIPA Polo Instructors and Players Association in cooperation with A Quechua World of Polo. It is the largest international beach polo tour. The rules are similar to arena polo.

== About ==
Beach polo tour events are played in stadiums in touristic destinations, like in Lignano Sabbiadoro for example where the worldwide largest beach polo arena is located. National teams compete in teams of two players each and fight in several events for the world championship title. The PIPA tournament series are featured by some equestrian but also sports media.

The 2015 Beach Polo Tour took place in four destinations: Graz, Vienna, Wiener Neustadt and Lignano Sabbiadoro.

The 2016 PIPA Beach Polo World Series is in planning and will be much bigger than the years before with ten events in eight countries all across the world. The 2016 tour starts with the event in Graz from June 10 to 12. Three or four more events are in planning in Europe during the summer months. The tour closes again with the mega event in Lignano Sabbiadoro.

== See also ==
- Polo
