= PIPA Snow Polo World Cup Tour =

The PIPA Snow Polo World Cup Tour is an international played series of worldwide Polo tournaments organized by the PIPA Polo Instructors and Players Association in cooperation with A Quechua World of Polo. Snow Polo Tournaments are played in teams with two or three players each. Teams are built by nationality, so for example there plays team Argentina versus Austria. The game and the rules are similar to Arena polo.

== History ==
What started with a single event in 2010 became bigger each year and since 2014 the PIPA Polo Instructors and Players Association Snow Polo World Cup Tour is held in several events across Europe. It generates more and more media visibility like the events at the famous Munich Olympicparc with more than 15.000 spectators every day, or event in Bad Gastein or the Olympic Region Seefeld Since the beginning of the Snow Polo World Cup, 13 nations have registered to participate at the events. Beneath middle-European nations like Austria or Germany, also the grand nations of Polo like Argentina, Uruguay or Brazil have registered for the world series.

== Snow Polo World Cup St. Moritz ==
Since 1985

https://www.snowpolo-stmoritz.com/previous-events/

1. 40th Snow Polo World Cup St. Moritz 2025
2. 41th Snow Polo World Cup St. Moritz 2026

== 2016 PIPA Snow Polo World Cup Tour ==
The 2016 PIPA Snow Polo World Cup Tour consisted of 5 events, three of them were played and two had to be cancelled, Munich because of too high temperatures and Rogla due to noncompliance of the community of Rogla Ski Resort regarding the PIPA grooming standards and guidelines. The first event took place in Seefeld in Tirol, where the German team with Joe Reinhard and Marie Haupt won after three gamedays. The second event was played under floodlight at Ramsau am Dachstein. After three days of polo England with playing captain could win the final game against Austria with playing captain Dr. Uwe Seebacher. The third event was played at Bad Gastein. Having windy conditions and warm temperatures it was again the English team winning the tournament after a thrilling final game against Austria.

According to those results, Austria won the 2016 tour two points ahead of England. For Austria, this title is the second one after 2014. The final table looks as follows:

1. Austria / 14 points
2. England / 12 points
3. Germany / 6 points
4. USA / 5 points
5. Italy, South Africa / 4 points

The tour reached a high media attention, ORF (broadcaster) reported as well as many national and international newspapers and websites.

== Previous Tour Results ==
The 2014 PIPA Snow Polo World Cup Tour was won by Austria, the 2015 champions were England. Here are the final tables for 2014 and 2015:

2015 Tour Ranking:

1. England (Tim Ward, Mac Aberle and Chris Voelkers)
2. Austria (Uwe Seebacher, Klarina Pichler and Benjamin Darroux)
3. Germany (Captain Joe Reinhard, Stefan Coszma and Marc van Eupen)

2014 Tour Ranking:

1. Austria 12 points
2. Slovakia 11 points
3. Switzerland 8 points
4. Italy 7 points
5. Germany 5 points
6. Liechtenstein 5 points
7. Denmark 3 points
8. Czech Republic 3 points

== See also ==
Arena polo
PIPA Polo Instructors and Players Association
Polo
