= Yancowinna County =

Yancowinna
- Cadastral division
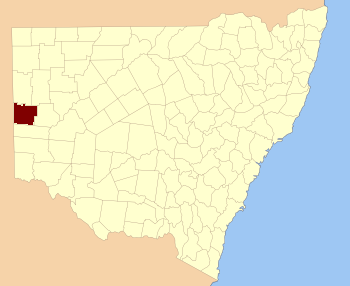
- Location in New South Wales
- Country: Australia
- State: New South Wales
Lands administrative divisions around Yancowinna
South Australia	Farnell	Mootwingee
South Australia	Yancowinna	Tandora
South Australia	Menindee	Tandora

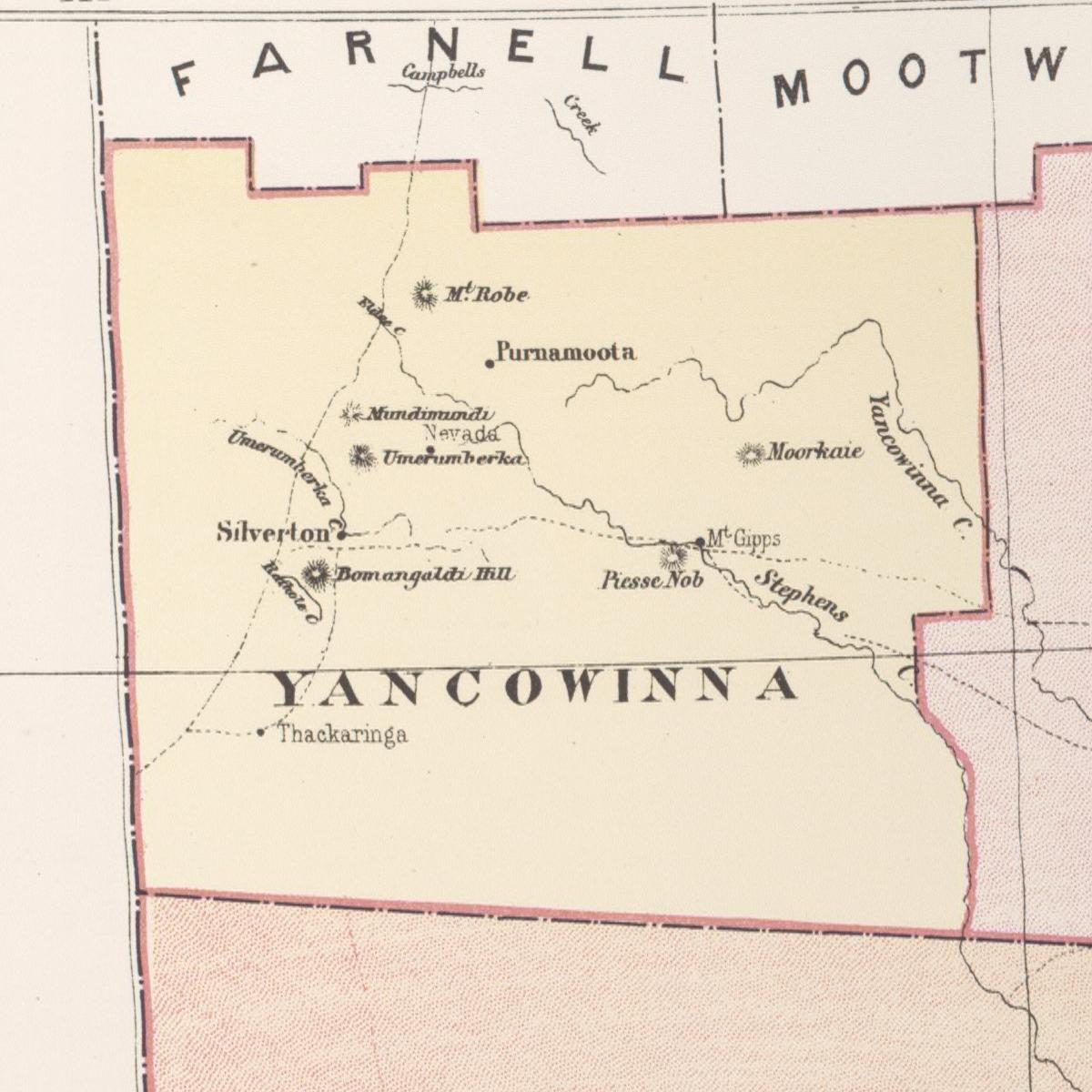
Yancowinna, shown in a map from 1886

Yancowinna County is one of the 141 cadastral divisions of New South Wales.

The county contains the city of Broken Hill (in Picton Parish) and village of Silverton (in Umberumberka Parish). The County also has the hamlets of Wallarunga/The Pinnacles and Burns; and the ghost towns of Tarrawingee and Purnamoota.

Some New South Wales industrial relations laws have excluded the county of Yancowinna. The county is also the only part of New South Wales which is in the same time zone as South Australia (UTC+09:30 rather than UTC+10:00).

The name Yancowinna is believed to be derived from a local Aboriginal word and is also the name of the location within the county of Yancowinna Glen.

== Parishes ==
A full list of parishes found within this county; their current LGA and mapping coordinates to the approximate centre of each location is as follows:

Parish	LGA	Coordinates
Albert	Unincorporated Far West	32°00′54″S 141°08′29″E
Aldborough	Unincorporated Far West	32°14′09″S 141°51′49″E
Alma	Unincorporated Far West	32°00′29″S 141°21′49″E
Barrier	Unincorporated Far West	32°09′24″S 141°38′10″E
Bolaira	Unincorporated Far West	31°57′47″S 141°32′30″E
Bomangaldy	Unincorporated Far West	31°49′58″S 141°11′11″E
Bray	Unincorporated Far West	31°57′37″S 141°15′19″E
Cambellia	Unincorporated Far West	
Carrington	Unincorporated Far West	31°49′58″S 141°04′34″E
Cathcart	Unincorporated Far West	31°47′09″S 141°35′28″E
Coombarra	Unincorporated Far West	32°09′22″S 141°28′29″E
Coonbaralla	Unincorporated Far West	32°03′22″S 141°49′46″E
Dhoon	Unincorporated Far West	32°07′55″S 141°08′39″E
Edgar	Unincorporated Far West	32°03′01″S 141°14′28″E
Elti	Unincorporated Far West	31°42′07″S 141°05′33″E
Fairy Hill	Unincorporated Far West	31°39′52″S 141°47′55″E
Farmcoat	Unincorporated Far West	32°05′13″S 141°40′35″E
Hughes	Unincorporated Far West	32°12′09″S 141°25′49″E
Inkerman	Unincorporated Far West	31°52′21″S 141°54′45″E
Jamieson	Unincorporated Far West	31°53′33″S 141°04′35″E
Lewis	Unincorporated Far West	31°45′14″S 141°24′00″E
Maharatta	Unincorporated Far West	31°51′14″S 141°46′46″E
Matong	Unincorporated Far West	31°49′05″S 141°50′09″E
Meadows	Unincorporated Far West	31°39′39″S 141°05′32″E
Moorkaie	Unincorporated Far West	31°49′09″S 141°38′47″E
Mount Gipps	Unincorporated Far West	31°46′30″S 141°29′16″E
Mundi Mundi	Unincorporated Far West	31°44′19″S 141°13′24″E
Myalla	Unincorporated Far West	31°44′04″S 141°55′39″E
Nadbuck	Unincorporated Far West	31°56′45″S 141°21′41″E
Naradin	Unincorporated Far West	31°53′06″S 141°21′39″E
Narran	Unincorporated Far West	32°07′38″S 141°47′26″E
Ophara	Unincorporated Far West	32°07′55″S 141°02′50″E
Picton	Unincorporated Far West, City of Broken Hill	31°54′34″S 141°28′11″E
Purnamoota	Unincorporated Far West	31°35′48″S 141°27′50″E
Redan	Unincorporated Far West	32°14′30″S 141°44′56″E
Robe	Unincorporated Far West	31°39′21″S 141°21′11″E
Sebastopol	Unincorporated Far West	32°03′39″S 141°33′25″E
Sentinel	Unincorporated Far West	32°10′36″S 141°14′49″E
Soudan	Unincorporated Far West	32°05′14″S 141°26′11″E
Stephen	Unincorporated Far West	31°48′38″S 141°22′04″E
Stratford	Unincorporated Far West	32°02′21″S 141°42′30″E
Tara	Unincorporated Far West	31°54′39″S 141°37′29″E
Thackaringa	Unincorporated Far West	31°57′42″S 141°06′21″E
Umberumberka	Unincorporated Far West	31°50′07″S 141°16′29″E
Victoria	Unincorporated Far West	32°04′16″S 141°02′47″E
Waukeroo	Unincorporated Far West	31°41′05″S 141°33′48″E
Yancowinna East	Unincorporated Far West	31°38′59″S 141°54′54″E
Yancowinna North	Unincorporated Far West	31°39′40″S 141°40′49″E
Yancowinna	Unincorporated Far West	31°45′29″S 141°43′04″E
Yangalla	Unincorporated Far West	31°36′56″S 141°14′23″E
