= Albert Morris =

Australian botanist and ecologist

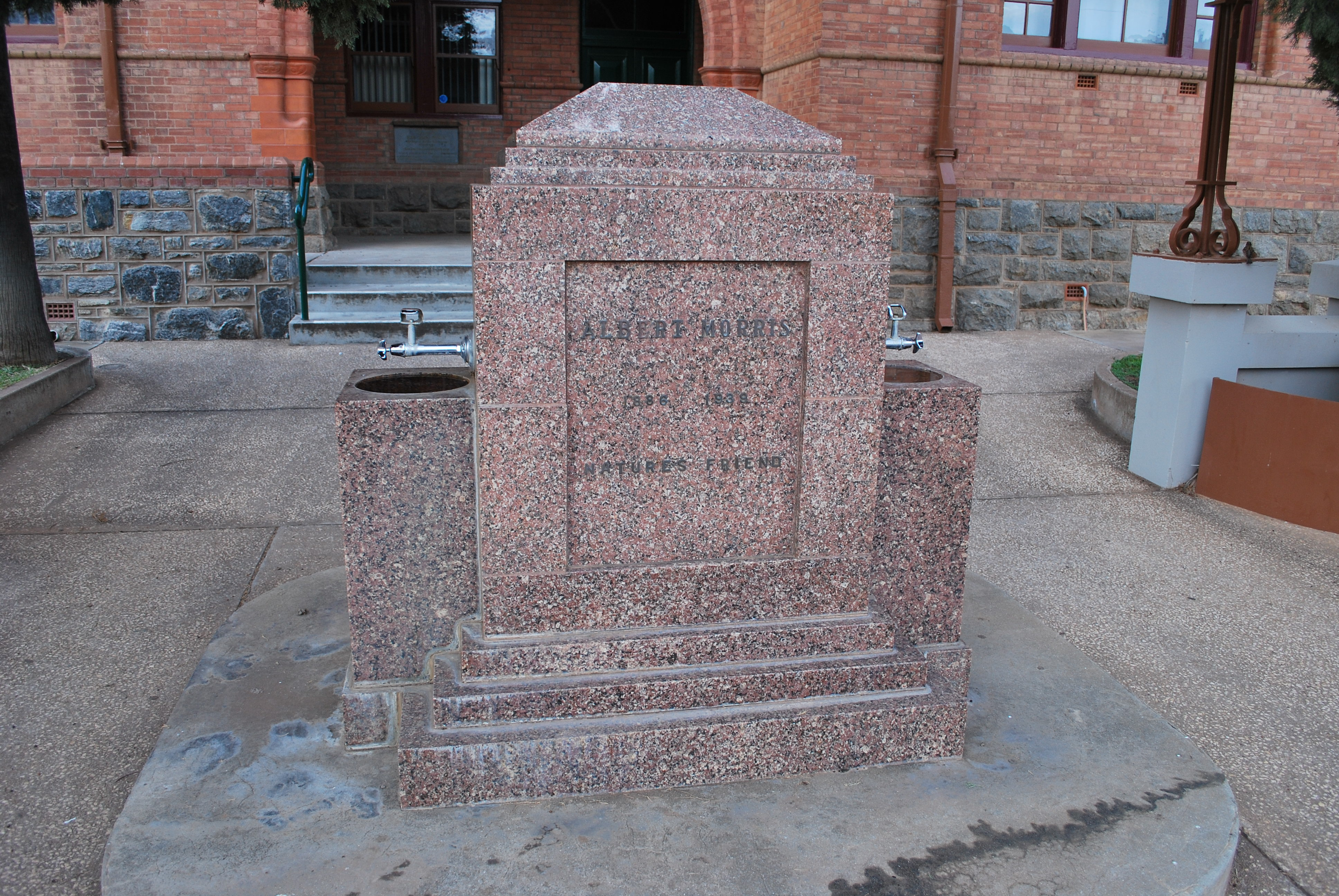
Memorial to Albert Morris, "Nature's Friend"

Albert Morris (13 August 1886 in Bridgetown, South Australia – 9 January 1939, Broken Hill New South Wales) was an acclaimed Australian botanist, landscaper, ecologist, conservationist and developer of arid-zone revegetation techniques that featured natural regeneration . Morris is particularly celebrated for his decisive role in the development of the Broken Hill regeneration area, a pioneering arid-zone natural regeneration project. The regeneration area project exhibited standards and principles characteristic of the contemporary environmental repair practice, ecological restoration. The work of Albert Morris, Margaret Morris and their restoration colleagues significantly influenced the development of New South Wales government soil erosion management policies in the 1940s.

== First Nations communities ==
From time immemorial traditional owners, the Wilyakali people, cared for homelands that encompassed the extended Broken Hill and Barrier Ranges region, western New South Wales (hereafter NSW). They maintained relations with the Barkandji (aka Paakantyi) nation, of the Baaka (aka Darling River). From ca.1830 onwards, pastoralists forcibly dispossessed the Barkandji and Wilyakali communities, seizing homelands along the Baaka and steadily extending their influence to more distant regions. As well as being dispossessed of their spiritually significant homelands, First Nations communities of western NSW were for many decades subjected to various hardships: material deprivation; widespread ill health and epidemics; racism; confinement to government reserves and denial of civil liberties. Dedicated government rectification of these injustices only commenced in the latter decades of the twentieth century. In 2015, the Wilyakali community and the Barkandji nation, after eighteen years of challenging and protracted legal proceedings, were successful in establishing their native title claim to traditional homelands along the Baaka and extensive areas of western NSW. Today, Australian First Nations communities assert that their homelands were never ceded to the Crown.

== Early life Morris ==
Albert was born in Bridgetown, South Australia, to parents Albert Joseph Morris and Emma Jane (Smith). Confronted by the economic depression that gripped South Australia in the late 1880s, Morris's father sought work in the new mines of far western NSW. He moved his family to Thackaringa, and then to nearby Broken Hill, to live. Broken Hill was to become Albert's permanent home.

Early in life, Albert developed a keen interest in plants. Possibly a serious childhood injury to his foot, which prevented him from taking part in the bustle of childhood activity, contributed to his independence and self-containment, and to an increasing interest in botany. However, it is documented that his father, Joe Morris, was an "enthusiastic" botanist and young Albert was his "offsider", so this was a more likely source of his botanical interests, as well as innate talent and an interest in the subject. By the time he was undertaking technical school studies in metallurgy and assaying, Morris had developed a small garden and nursery, and contributed to the cost of his fees by selling plants (pepper trees) that he had grown. Morris took up work with the Central Mine in Broken Hill, eventually becoming chief assayer for the company.

Albert Morris and Ellen Margaret Sayce (1887-1957) were married on 13 April 1909. Margaret (Morris) was a dressmaker, and developed extensive interests and skills in art, botany, conservation and journalism. She was a member of the Society of Friends, (Quakers). Albert's formative years were spent as an Anglican, and "some years" after his marriage he converted to Quakerism. Albert and Margaret, with family assistance, built a cottage in Cornish Street, Railway Town, a western suburb of Broken Hill.

== Broken Hill work ==
=== Erosion and early experiments 1900s ===
By ca.1900, the previously well vegetated homelands of the Wilyakali community had progressively been exploited by overstocking on pastoralist stations (properties, or ranches), and further devastated by introduced animals such as rabbits, foxes and feral goats. The mining industry and the impacts of people and their stock had resulted in the Broken Hill region being stripped of trees such as Acacia aneura Mulga, Eucalyptus camaldulensis River Red Gum, and soil binding shrubs and ground cover plants. Natural recovery from these detrimental impacts was inhibited by the arid climate, which featured low average rainfall of 250 millimetres or less per annum, long dry periods and high summer temperatures. Exposed to the regular westerly winds, previously well vegetated and stable soils had been transformed into soil-drifts; severe dust storms were common. By the 1920s, these degraded vegetation and soil conditions were regarded as the norm.

As early as 1908, newspaper comments indicated that the sheet erosion around Broken Hill had already begun. Morris described the degraded landscape in these terms: "The extending country stretched for miles without a vestige of any green thing and each stone or old tin had a streamer of sand tailing out from it. The fences were piled high with sand, inside and out and it looked as if the intended railway lines would just be buried every dusty day, which was every windy day".

Albert and Margaret Morris were concerned about the detrimental impacts that wind erosion was inflicting on the amenity of their fellow citizens in Broken Hill, as houses, gardens, roads and public facilities were often smothered in sand. Albert lamented the loss of indigenous fauna species brought about by the destruction of their natural habitat, and the breakdown of local natural ecosystems and their beauty. He looked for ways to manage these issues.

Several failures at establishing a barrier to the wind blown sand deposits in his exposed garden inspired Morris to search for plants that could be grown in the prevailing tough arid conditions, and which would control erosion by binding the exposed soils. He and Margaret began to acquire expertise with botanical taxonomy and systematics, and by the mid 1920s Albert was corresponding with other Australian botanists. He established a home nursery, purchasing adjoining land and expanding his garden.

=== Barrier Field Naturalists Club 1920 ===
In 1920, along with Margaret Morris and W.D.K. McGillivray (1868-1933), a local doctor and also a prominent Australian ornithologist and natural scientist, Albert helped establish the Broken Hill based Barrier Field Naturalists Club, serving as its secretary until his death in 1939. Margaret also served on the executive of the club. Members were interested in natural sciences such as botany and geology, and also history, conducting regular field trips and lecture series. Albert and Margaret were prominent members, participating in field trips to the country around Broken Hill, studying and collecting specimens of the indigenous flora and observing the local ecosystems.

As well as Margaret's diverse contributions, throughout the 1920s and 1930s Albert's botanical, conservation, tree plantation and regeneration work were strongly stimulated and supported by the many members of the Field Naturalists Club, people such as Dr. William MacGillivray, his son Dr. Ian MacGillivray, Edmund Dow, Maurice Mawby and many others. Morris became widely recognised for his botanical expertise, urban tree plantation work, his propagation and contributions of plants to residents and civic bodies in Broken Hill, and for his firm belief in the possibility of revegetating the barren city landscapes.

=== The influence of Professor T G Osborn 1920s ===
University of Adelaide botanist and plant ecologist Professor T G Osborn had been concerned about the degradation of South Australia's arid-zone flora, and the resultant wind erosion, since approximately 1920. At the university's Koonamore research facility, Yunta, he studied the capacity of the flora to naturally regenerate under stock exclosure conditions. Osborn concluded that overstocking on pastoral stations was the primary cause of the vegetation degradation, and that natural regeneration of the flora was possible. He advised pastoralists to carefully manage station stocking levels, and to preserve the indigenous vegetation.

South Australian pastoralists heeded Osborn's research work and advice. From approximately 1930, pastoralists developed "'flora reserves", which were fenced areas that excluded stock and allowed natural regeneration of the indigenous flora. The largest known flora reserve was approximately four hectares (ten acres). Other pastoralists undertook furrowing projects (a form of ploughing), a practice that facilitated the natural regeneration of the flora. Many of these projects were highly successful, and degraded, wind eroded soil-drifts and scalds (areas of eroded, hardened, water impervious soil) were revegetated and stabilised.

Albert Morris was certainly aware of Professor Osborn's Koonamore research work by 1928, as the research was well publicised and Morris had engaged in botanical correspondence with Osborn. Quite possibly Morris visited the Koonamore research facility, as it was located only approximately 250 kilometres from Broken Hill. The restoration work of South Australian pastoralists also received some newspaper publicity, so it is quite possible that Morris's thinking on the restoration of degraded indigenous flora was influenced by the stock exclosure and natural regeneration research and projects conducted in South Australia.

=== Botany, conservation, restoration 1930s ===
Morris achieved national and international recognition as an expert on arid-zone Australian flora, and corresponded with many prominent Australian botanists. He, with Margaret, made a collection of about 8000 plant specimens, the bulk of which were donated to the Waite Institute in South Australia in 1944. This collection is now predominantly held by the State Herbarium of South Australia with some specimens held by other state collections, including the Royal Botanic Garden of NSW. He and Margaret were noted for their generosity and hospitality to fellow naturalists and others working at Broken Hill. Among those they befriended was the noted botanist and author Thistle Harris, who worked in Broken Hill as a teacher c.1930.

By 1936 Albert Morris had acquired considerable expertise in the distinct fields of arid-zone tree plantation establishment, and arid-zone natural regeneration. His expertise in natural regeneration was based on the field knowledge that he had acquired on Barrier Field Naturalists Club outings into the surrounding countryside, and his deep botanical knowledge of arid-zone flora species. His own home nursery experiments with sand stabilising plants such as Atriplex spp. saltbushes, further enhanced his regeneration and restoration knowledge. Quite possibly the natural regeneration work of Professor Osborn and the South Australian pastoralists had influenced him. Broad acreage furrowing field trials, conducted in 1935-36 by Morris with local pastoralists on their pastoral stations, facilitated natural regeneration of the indigenous flora and must also have convinced him of the efficacy of natural regeneration as a means of restoring degraded lands.

Albert was also possessed of extensive administrative and communication skills. His professional employment as an assayer involved responsible administrative duties, and he utilised this experience to good effect in his volunteer conservation work. As secretary of the Barrier Field Naturalists Club, he corresponded with and lobbied New South Wales state government ministers and other representatives of industry and government bodies, on conservation and restoration matters. In particular, in 1935, he wrote on behalf of the Barrier Field Naturalists to the New South Wales state government, urging the government to establish a fenced natural regeneration area around Broken Hill. In April 1936, Albert and other field naturalists presented detailed submissions on soil and flora conservation, and stock exclosure and natural regeneration techniques, to the New South Wales Erosion Committee.

=== Tree plantations, regeneration reserves 1936 ===
Equipped with evidence of the efficacy of stock exclosure and natural regeneration as a means of restoring eroded lands, in May 1936 Albert and club members commenced lobbying the state government to fence two water reservoir sites in Broken Hill, to exclude stock and rabbits and allow the indigenous flora there to naturally regenerate. Due to Albert's persistence, this work was approved in September 1937, and the fencing was done in April 1939, shortly after his death.

However, Albert Morris is best remembered and celebrated for the natural regeneration area that now encircles Broken Hill, a project that is today referred to as the Broken Hill regeneration area. Displaying considerable initiative and management skills, Morris demonstrated to Broken Hill mining executives the botanical feasibility of his plans, and convinced them to financially back the project. The natural regeneration area project was conceived in the winter of 1936, and commenced in the spring of that year.

The Zinc Corporation, another Broken Hill mining company, had developed extensive plans to commence construction in 1936 of a new mine complex on a bare, desert like piece of ground located along the south-west urban fringes of Broken Hill. The company engaged the honorary services of Albert Morris to advise on the establishment of tree plantations adjacent to the proposed new mining, office and residential complex, to protect the complex from sand-drifts and the strong local westerly winds. Construction of these tree plantations, which were to be irrigated with waste water and established by traditional planting methods, but using indigenous Australian vegetation including saltbushes, a method Morris had experimented with, commenced in May, 1936.

The initial fencing of the main tree plantation site facilitated rapid and substantial natural regeneration within the still unplanted, and otherwise bare, fenced enclosure, of native grasses and forbs germinating from seed naturally stored in the soil. Crucially, this regrowth of indigenous vegetation persisted, as a result of foraging livestock and rabbits having been excluded by the new fencing.

The knowledgeable Albert Morris had fully anticipated and predicted the natural regeneration that occurred within the fenced tree plantations adjacent to the new mining complex. As mentioned, he had already observed and confirmed this process in previous broad acreage field trials, and was aware of the ways in which arid-zone indigenous flora seed could be naturally dispersed by wind and stored in the soil, germinate, and thrive after relatively small amounts of rainfall. Although at this time natural regeneration of many indigenous flora species, such as Eucalyptus spp. (often referred to as gum trees), was a familiar concept to many settler Australians, Morris's knowledge of the viability of various arid plant species' seed, and his experience with the natural regeneration capabilities of the indigenous flora communities, were exceptional.

Morris seized on this significant (approx. 22 acres; 9 hectares) demonstration of natural regeneration principles, and convinced the Zinc Corporation mine manager, A J Keast, to obtain the backing of senior Zinc Corp executive, W S Robinson, and other mining companies in Broken Hill, to undertake a new, separate project, the trial fencing of regeneration reserves to the south-west of the city. Morris intended that these reserves would primarily utilise natural regeneration, and limited, targeted amounts of planting, as their primary means of revegetation.

=== Broken Hill regeneration area 1936-58 ===
Work on the Zinc Corporation mining complex tree plantations continued, but Morris, also in an honorary capacity, was now additionally advising on the new Broken Hill regeneration area project, which consisted of a series of fenced regeneration reserves extending around the south-west perimeter of Broken Hill and covering hundreds of hectares. This work commenced in the spring of 1936 and was completed in February 1937. Further reserves were added between 1937 and 1939. Good rains fell, and substantial revegetation success was achieved across all of the reserves. The entire south and westward aspects of Broken Hill were now protected from wind driven sand-drifts by naturally regenerated indigenous vegetation of the type that naturally occurred on the site. The traditional owners of the lands of Broken Hill and the surrounding region, the dispossessed Wilyakali community, appear to have had no opportunities to consider contributing to the development of the regeneration area project, despite their long and deep physical and spiritual connections to these lands. Also, it is unlikely that their Traditional Ecological Knowledge was utilised, either directly or indirectly.

Sadly, Albert Morris died in January 1939, after several months of illness, but he did live to see substantial evidence of the success of his regeneration vision and initiatives. Indeed, the successful vegetation regeneration within the initial set of regeneration reserves was highly praised by the visiting South Australian Erosion Committee in June 1937. Before he died, Albert was also aware that a Broken Hill community progress association had successfully obtained funds from the state government to finance the construction of a regeneration reserve to the south of the city in 1938-39. Unfortunately, Albert did not live to see the beneficial effect that the good rains of 1939 had on the reserves.

The resource demands of the Second World War (1939–45) delayed the development of further regeneration reserves and the encirclement of the city with a protective belt of indigenous flora. During this challenging period Margaret Morris played an important role in the botanical management, study and documentation of the reserves. She successfully promoted their benefits with regular newspaper articles, and authored an influential article in the Australian Journal of Science. In her various articles, Margaret emphasised the natural regeneration of indigenous species, such as Acacia aneura Mulga, that had occurred in the reserves. She wrote of the natural resilience of the regeneration reserves, correctly predicting that they would survive the severe drought of 1940, and was unstinting in her generous acknowledgement of the contributions made by members of the Broken Hill community, the mining industry and Broken Hill Council. The Barrier Field Naturalists Club also continued its involvement with the reserves, with members conducting botanical surveys of the thriving natural flora and advocating for the extension of the regeneration area. The Mine Managers Association of Broken Hill financed the upkeep of the regeneration reserves, and Broken Hill Council managed this work.

The citizens of Broken Hill suffered severely from the effects of the 1940 drought, and further prolonged dry periods in the early to mid-1940s, as enormous dust storms ravaged the city. Due to the success and popularity of the regeneration reserves, from 1946 the city administration lobbied the New South Wales government to complete the encirclement of the city with further regeneration reserves. Three new reserves were fenced to the north and east of Broken Hill between 1950 and 1958, and natural regeneration of the indigenous vegetation occurred. The regeneration reserves created between 1936 and 1958 now primarily comprise the current Broken Hill regeneration area, with minor adjustments having been made over the years.

=== Natural regeneration ===
It has in the past, and still is very often mistakenly assumed, that planting techniques were predominantly utilised to initially establish the regeneration reserves, and that the regeneration area project was primarily an exercise in planting. It is correct that the Zinc Corporation tree plantations of 1936-37, quite separate and also small projects relative to the regeneration reserves, and located immediately adjacent to the urban area and piped water resources, were irrigated, and their vegetation established by the manual planting of thousands of trees, along with saltbushes; this was documented at the time. However it is clear from Albert Morris's interest in natural regeneration, as already outlined in this article, and the historical documentation, that the regeneration reserves, as distinct from the tree plantations, primarily and intentionally utilised principles of stock exclosure (fencing to exclude stock) and natural regeneration, and not planting, to achieve the revegetation, with indigenous flora, of the hitherto barren reserves.

Albert Morris was interested in achieving broad acreage arid-zone revegetation outcomes, both for amenity and conservation purposes, and as he realised, it would have been impossible to achieve this, given the prevailing dry, hot and often drought-stricken conditions, by utilising a planting technique. To propagate, manually plant and then keep hydrated until they were established the tens of thousands of trees, shrubs, grasses and forbs necessary for such a project, conducted over many hundreds of rugged hectares, would have required extensive seed collection and plant propagation capabilities, and generous personnel resources and funding; it is unlikely that such a project would even be feasible today. There is no evidence of such a large planting project occurring at the time of the establishment of the regeneration reserves. It was clearly Morris's intention that the establishment of vegetation in the regeneration reserves was to be primarily left to the factors associated with natural regeneration: germination of existing, naturally deposited and wind dispersed seeds of the local flora, the regrowth of established but degraded in ground rootstocks, and the local rainfall of approximately 250mm per year. Crucially, fencing around the reserves excluded the livestock and rabbits that had previously decimated this indigenous flora. In fact, University of Sydney researchers Professor Eric Ashby and Ilma Pidgeon were drawn to the project in order to study the spectacular natural regeneration of the indigenous flora that had occurred following exclusion of stock, and concluded that ‘fencing the land has restored the vegetation’. Spreading of seed by hand, and the ploughing of moisture impermeable claypans (aka scalds), were techniques also contemplated by Morris. Relatively little or no tree or shrub planting was done in order to establish the regeneration reserves, except in an undefined section of regeneration reserve no. 2, which was also irrigated, as this reserve was adjacent to the small and irrigated tree plantation no. 1, now known as Albert Morris Park. Some planting was carried out by community members along water courses and in claypans, and extensive tree planting was carried out along some road verges from approximately 1939.

=== Ecological restoration ===
The historical regeneration area project exhibits principles of the contemporary environmental repair concept, ecological restoration. See National standards for the practice of ecological restoration in Australia. Substantial to full restoration of the indigenous flora was aspired to; appropriate levels of site intervention, predominantly in the form of fencing and small amounts of furrowing and planting were adopted, with re-establishment of the indigenous vegetation primarily left to natural regeneration; formal science and local ecological knowledge were utilised; the indigenous flora and fauna were conserved; the residents of Broken Hill came to appreciate and engage with the project. However, as noted, there is no record of traditional owners and Custodians of the regional lands, the Wilyakali community, being presented with opportunities to consider contributing to the project.

== Government erosion management policies and legislation 1940s ==
The Broken Hill regeneration area project and its outcomes significantly influenced the development of NSW state government soil erosion management policies and legislation. NSW Soil Conservation Service (established 1938) director Sam Clayton, and researcher Noel Beadle, were impressed by the successful revegetation outcomes achieved within the regeneration area. Throughout the 1940s, they pushed for and implemented state government land management policies that aimed to revegetate, by stock exclosure and natural regeneration processes, those landscapes of western NSW that were in a degraded vegetation condition, but were still, fortunately, not yet wind or water eroded. To achieve this outcome, Beadle recognised that tree planting programs were completely unfeasible, given the extent of the problem and the arid conditions. Clayton and Beadle also targeted the revegetation of the twenty million hectares of western NSW that were in an eroded condition. To achieve both of these objectives, state legislation was passed in 1949, and stock exclosure and natural regeneration processes were codified as government land management techniques and policies; overstocking was outlawed.

== Remembrance and celebration ==
The regeneration area still encircles Broken Hill today, providing the city with an attractive ring of natural vegetation. Broken Hill City Council manages the regeneration area, with the crucial support of Landcare Broken Hill and members of the Barrier Field Naturalists Club. The regeneration reserves were recognised as cultural heritage items by the New South Wales National Trust in 1991. In 2015 the City of Broken Hill was declared a place of national heritage values by the Australian government. As part of this recognition, Albert's achievements, and the Broken Hill regeneration reserves, were listed as heritage values of the city.

The work of Albert Morris was valued and commemorated by the citizens of Broken Hill. In 1941 an impressive water fountain, dedicated to his memory and funded by public subscription, was installed outside the Technical College, Argent Street, Broken Hill. In 1944 Margaret Morris opened the Albert Morris Memorial Gates, which are now located in Wentworth Road, Broken Hill. The John Scougall Gates, named after Jack Scougall, a foreman of works on the regeneration reserves and later manager of the Zinc Corporation nursery, stand nearby.

A consortium of Australian ecological restoration organisations initiated the Albert Morris Award for an Outstanding Ecological Restoration Project in 2017, to mark the eighty year anniversary of the completion of the first regeneration reserves in 1937. In 22–24 August 2017, the Australian Association of Bush Regenerators, Broken Hill City Council, The Barrier Field Naturalists Club, Landcare Broken Hill and Broken Hill Art Exchange, came together with many visitors and local residents in Broken Hill to mark this event, with field trips and an inaugural Albert Morris Ecological Restoration Award dinner. The Award dinner recognised the skills, dedication and community spirit of Albert Morris, Margaret Morris and their many colleagues in the Barrier Field Naturalists Club, the contributions of Broken Hill citizens and community members, and the contributions of the mining industry of Broken Hill, Broken Hill City Council and the New South Wales state government, to the regeneration area project.

At the Award dinner the inaugural Albert Morris Award for an Outstanding Ecological Restoration Project was presented "to the Broken Hill Regeneration Reserves Project itself and all those who made it happen from 1936-1958 and those who are still making it happen". The actual award is a sculpture crafted by Badger Bates, a distinguished Barkandji (Paakantji), Broken Hill artist. The sculpture is titled 'Regeneration’ and is made from the wattle "Dead Finish", Acacia tetragonophylla. The 2018 Award was presented at the Society for Ecological Restoration Australasia Conference held in Brisbane, September, 2018, to Murray Local Land Services, recognising the Murray Riverina Travelling Stock Reserves Project.

== 1930s South Australian work ==
In 1932 Essington Lewis, famed manager of the Australian industrial and mining corporation, Broken Hill Proprietary Company (BHP), invited Albert Morris to visit South Australia and investigate the possibility of establishing tree plantations at the companies' corporate towns of Whyalla and Iron Knob, for amenity purposes. During a series of visits between 1932 and 1937, Morris (the historical documentation does not record participation by Margaret Morris in the South Australian projects), successfully established an Australian flora plant nursery in Whyalla and developed plantations of Australian flora there and at Iron Knob. He also advised the municipal council of Port Pirie on the possibility of establishing plantations there, although no actual work appears to have been undertaken.

Morris initiated two natural regeneration projects in Whyalla, approximately between 1935 and 1937 (precise dates unknown). At Hummock Hill, fencing of the bare site to exclude dairy cattle led to the regeneration of the indigenous flora. The second project was located on the current site of the Ada Ryan Gardens in Whyalla, and involved the management of invasive beach sand dunes, by fencing to exclude rabbits and cattle, allowing the indigenous flora to recover. By 1939 both projects were being hailed as major successes, with tangible outcomes being evident.
