= Pimelea petrophila =

Scientific classification
- Kingdom: Plantae
- Clade: Tracheophytes
- Clade: Angiosperms
- Clade: Eudicots
- Clade: Rosids
- Order: Malvales
- Family: Thymelaeaceae
- Genus: Pimelea
- Species: P. petrophila

Binomial name
- Pimelea petrophila F.Muell.

Species of shrub

Pimelea petrophila is a species of flowering plant in the family Thymelaeaceae and is endemic to southern continental Australia. It is an erect, dioecious shrub with hairy young stems, elliptic or narrowly elliptic leaves, and heads of white flowers surrounded by 2 or 4 leaf-like involucral bracts.

== Description ==
Pimelea petrophila is an erect, dioecious shrub that typically grows to a height of 0.3–1 m (1 ft 0 in – 3 ft 3 in) and has its young stems covered with short, fine hairs. The leaves are arranged in opposite pairs, elliptic to narrowly elliptic, 6–33 mm (0.24–1.30 in) long, 1.5–8 mm (0.059–0.315 in) wide and usually glabrous. The flowers are arranged in clusters of many white flowers, surrounded by 2 to 4 leaf-like involucral bracts 8–16 mm (0.31–0.63 in) long, 3–9 mm (0.12–0.35 in) wide and usually longer than the male flowers. The floral tube of male flowers is 4.5–6 mm (0.18–0.24 in) long, the sepals 2–3 mm (0.079–0.118 in) long, the floral tube of female flowers is 4.0–5.5 mm (0.16–0.22 in) long with sepals 1.0–1.8 mm (0.039–0.071 in) long. Flowering mainly occurs from July to October.

This pimelea is similar to P. flava but has seeds with a pitted (foveate) surface, whereas those of P. flava are furrowed.

== Taxonomy and naming ==
Pimelea petrophila was first formally described in 1853 by Ferdinand von Mueller in journal Linnaea. The specific epithet (petrophila) means "rock-loving".

== Distribution and habitat ==
This pimelea grows on rocky hills on the Eyre Peninsula, Flinders and Mount Lofty Ranges of South Australia and on the Barrier Ranges of far western New South Wales.
