= Albert Parish (Yancowinna County) =

Albert Parish located at 32.0150°S 141.1413°E is a remote rural area, and cadastral Parish of Yancowinna County, far western New South Wales. The parish is on the Barrier Highway midway between Broken Hill, New South Wales and Cockburn on the South Australian border.

The landscape is arid, sparsely vegetated with rolling treeless hills and has a Köppen climate classification of BWk desert.

== Location ==
Albert Parish is on the Barrier Highway, Crystal Brook–Broken Hill railway line. The topography is flat and sparsely vegetated. Albert Parish, New South Wales is part of the traditional lands of the Wilyakali people.

== See also ==
- Albert, New South Wales
- Lake Albert, New South Wales
- Albert Parish (Delialah County), New South Wales
- Albert Parish (Yantara County) New South Wales
- Albert, (Drake County) New South Wales
- Albert, (Kennedy County) New South Wales
- Albert, (Macquarie County) New South Wales
- Albert, (Sandon County) New South Wales
- Albert, (St Vincent County) New South Wales
