= Naradin, Yancowinna County =

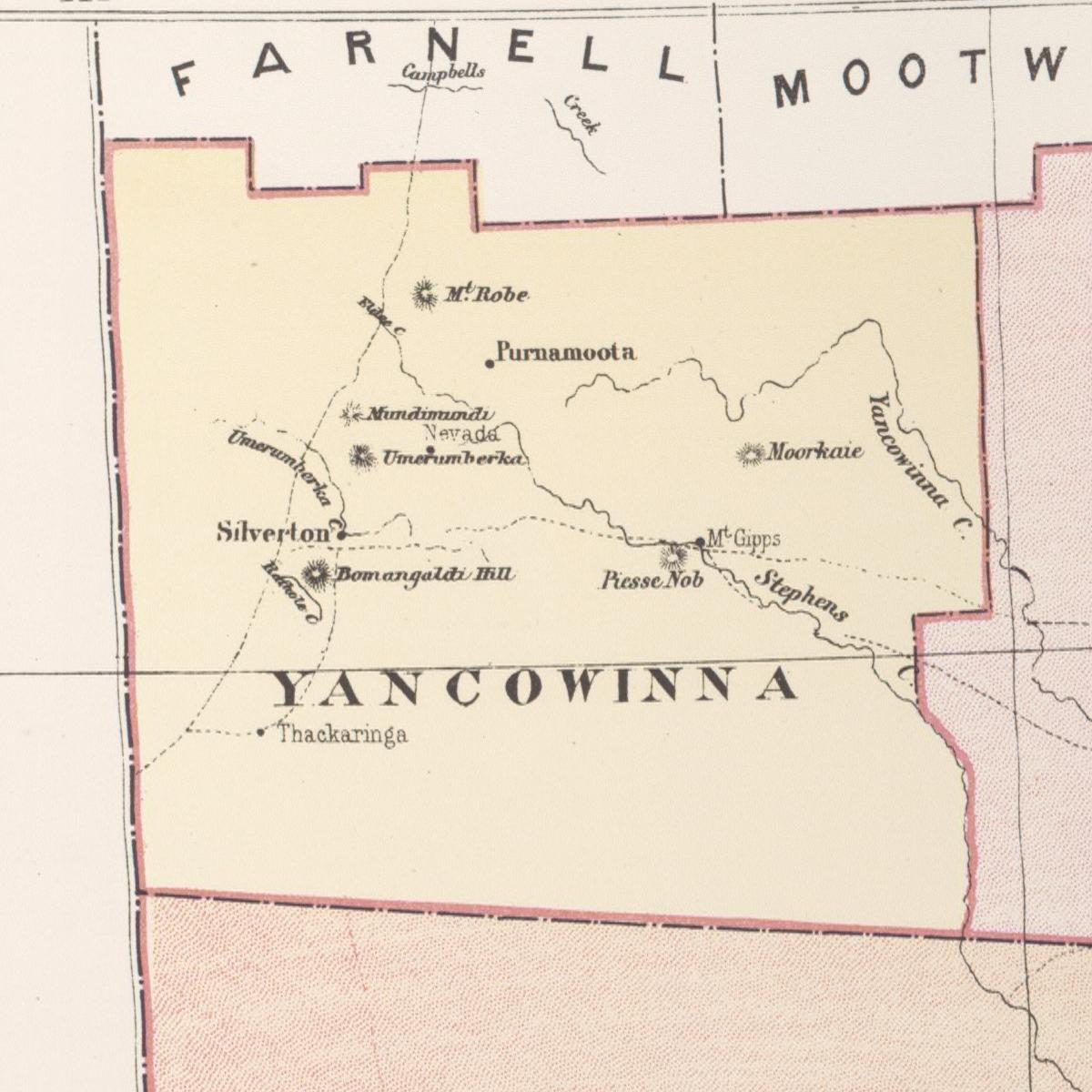
Yancowinna, shown in a map from 1886

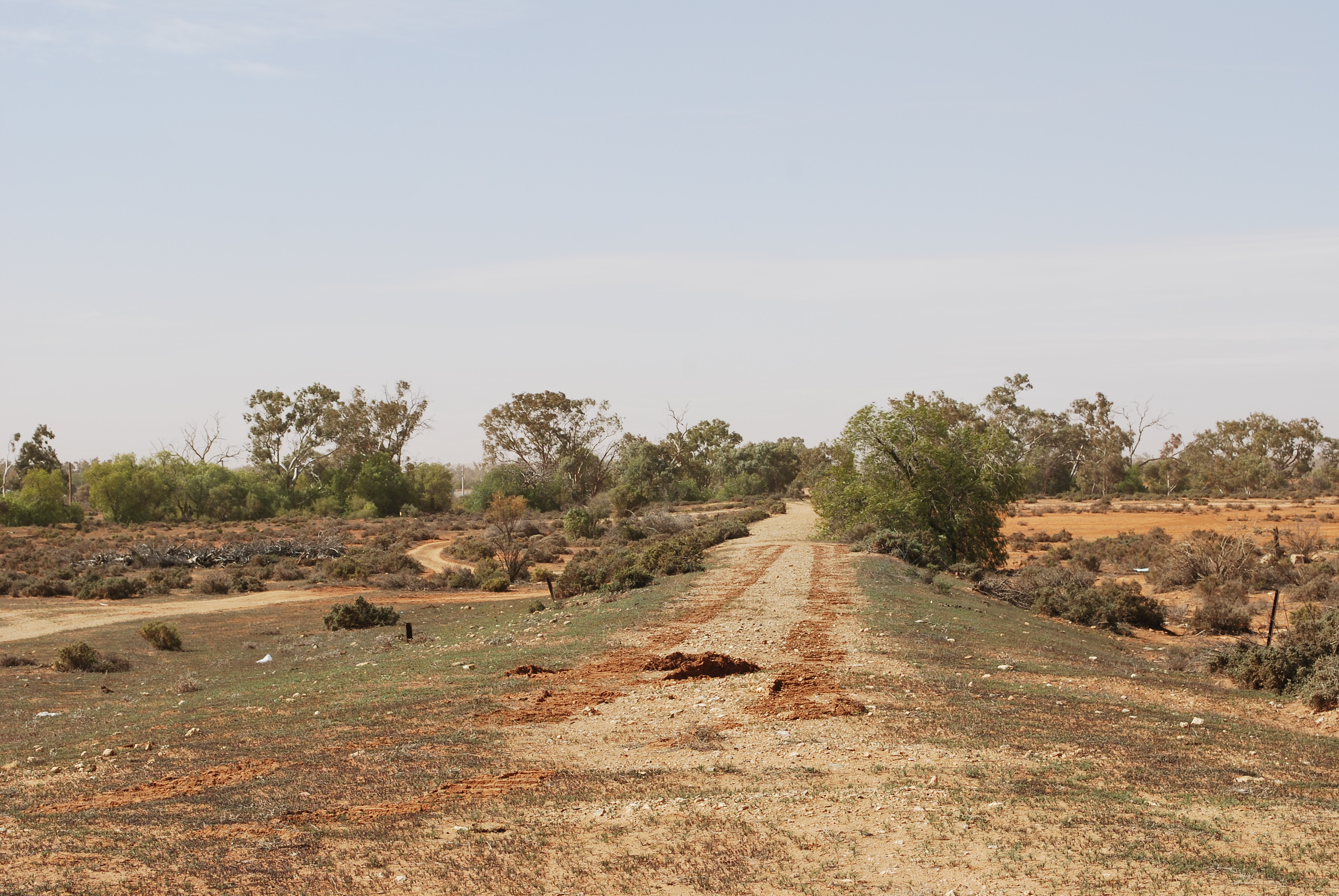
County around Naradin.

Naradin is a rural locality in Far western New South Wales, Australia, and a civil parish of Yancowinna County.

Naradin is arid and sparsely settled with the economy derived mainly from broad acre agriculture, though some mining occurs. Naradin was on the Silverton Tramway between Broken Hill and Silverton, New South Wales.

The parish is in the Unincorporated Far West and the nearest town is Broken Hill, New South Wales. Naradin has a Köppen climate classification of BWh and BWk desert.

Naradin is part of the traditional lands of the Wiljali people.

The area was opened due to the discover of minerals in the 19th century.

Silver, lead, feldspar and beryl are still extracted in the area today.
