= Nadbuck, Yancowinna County =

Yancowinna County is a rural locality in Unincorporated Far West and a civil parish of Yancowinna County in far western New South Wales.

The parish is at 31°56′45″S 141°21′41″E.

== History ==
Nadbuck is part of the traditional lands of the Wiljali people.

The area was opened to European settlement after the discovery of minerals in the 19th century.
