= Robe, Yancowinna County =

Robe, Yancowinna County is a civil parish of Yancowinna County in Far Western New South Wales. The parish is located near Purnamoota north of Broken Hill.

The parish takes its name from Mount Robe a peak in the Barrier Range located at 31º 39' 24.26" S 141º 19' 35.81" E. and has an altitude of 459.66m.
