= Purnamoota =

Purnamoota is a rural locality, cattle station (Purnamoota Station), and ghost town of the Unincorporated Far West and a civil parish of Yancowinna County, and is located about 23 km (14 mi) north of Broken Hill, New South Wales, Australia.

Purnamoota is located at 31°35′48″S 141°27′50″E and is at an elevation of approximately 330m above sea level. It has a Köppen climate classification of BWh desert.

In the 1880s Purnamoota was famous for the slugs of almost pure silver found on the surface.

The Purnamoota Creek flows through the parish.

== History ==
Purnamoota is part of the traditional lands of the Wiljali people. The area was opened to European settlement due to the discovery of minerals in the 19th century.

A town was established in the 19th century with a grid of five streets by five. Purnamoota's population peaked at 400, though only the church building and assembly hall remain of the town.

"Originally referred to as Leadville, about 32 km north of Broken Hill, and 18 km west of Yanko Glen, was a small township built near a soakage on the Nine-Mile Creek. It was the centre for the families of prospectors who moved into the Appollyon Valley in 1884 when the Lubra, Victory, Terrible Dick (which built a small smelter), Purnamoota, White Princess, Bird in Hand, War Dance and other claims were opened up. Approximately 400 people lived at Purnamoota, which contained two stores (Walter Sully and E. Sims), two hotels (Purnamoota and the Commercial), a school (provisional school), the Commercial Bank of Sydney, and a Post-Telegraph office. J. W. Fairchild manufactured steam cordials, aerated water and Liqueurs at Purnamoota. Purnamoota Assembly Hall was built in 1888."

The silver gave out, however, and in October 1898 the Barrier Miner described the Purnamoota as "one house, 100 abandoned claims, 500 abandoned potholes, 10,000 abandoned hopes, piles of rubbish, much desolation and a pretty name."

Today the town is part of Purnamoota Station.
