= Swainsona fissimontana =

Scientific classification
- Kingdom: Plantae
- Clade: Tracheophytes
- Clade: Angiosperms
- Clade: Eudicots
- Clade: Rosids
- Order: Fabales
- Family: Fabaceae
- Subfamily: Faboideae
- Genus: Swainsona
- Species: S. fissimontana

Binomial name
- Swainsona fissimontana J.M.Black

Species of legume

Swainsona fissimontana is a species of flowering plant in the family Fabaceae and is endemic to inland areas of southern continental Australia. It is a compact, erect or upright perennial herb with imparipinnate leaves with 7 to 13 narrowly elliptic to elliptic leaflets, and racemes of pink to dark purplish flowers in racemes of 3 to 11.

== Description ==
Swainsona fissimontana is a compact, erect or upright perennial herb, that typically grows to a height of up to 50 cm (20 in) and has densely softly-hairy stems. The leaves are imparipinnate, mostly 40–90 mm (1.6–3.5 in) long with 7 to 13 narrowly elliptic to elliptic leaflets, the leaflets 5–15 mm (0.20–0.59 in) long and 1–3 mm (0.039–0.118 in) wide with linear stipules 4–8 mm (0.16–0.31 in) long at the base of the petioles. The flowers are pink to dark purplish, arranged in racemes of 3 to 11 on a peduncle 0.5–1.5 mm (0.020–0.059 in) long with egg-shaped bracts 1–2 mm (0.039–0.079 in) long at the base. Each flower is 8–10 mm (0.31–0.39 in) long on a pedicel about 3 mm (0.12 in) long, the sepals are joined at the base to form a rounded tube about 3 mm (0.12 in) long with tapering lobes shorter than the tube. The standard petal is about 10 mm (0.39 in) long and 10–13 mm (0.39–0.51 in) wide, the wings 8–12 mm (0.31–0.47 in) long and the keel 8–11 mm (0.31–0.43 in) long. Flowering usually occurs from August to December, and the fruit is an elliptic pod 15–25 mm (0.59–0.98 in) long with the remains of the style about 7 mm (0.28 in) long.

== Taxonomy and naming ==
Swainsona fissimontana was first formally described in 1927 by John McConnell Black in the Transactions and Proceedings of the Royal Society of South Australia, from specimens collected by Albert Morris north of Broken Hill. The specific epithet (fissimontana) means Broken Hill.

== Distribution ==
This species of pea grows in stony or rocky places on plains or hillsides from far western New South Wales to Lake Eyre, the Flinders Ranges and south-eastern regions of South Australia.
