= Wallarunga =

Rural locality in New South Wales, Australia

Wallarunga is a rural locality and ghost town located at −32.031799316 and 141.317901611 about 10 kilometres south west of Broken Hill, New South Wales.

== Geography ==
Wallarunga is on the Broken Hill to Adelaide railway line and is the site of railway siding.

Wallarunga has a Köppen climate classification of BWh and BWk desert and is situated on the Pine Creek in the Alma parish.

Mining is the main industry of Wallarunga, with some broad acre agriculture.

== History ==
Wallarunga is part of the traditional lands of the Wiljali people.

The area was opened to Europeans after the discovery of minerals in the 19th century. Silver, lead, feldspar and beryl are still extracted in the area today.

The area is also known as the Pinnacles due to the rock formations in Wallarunga.
