= Cockburn, South Australia =

Town and locality in South Australia

Cockburn
- Town
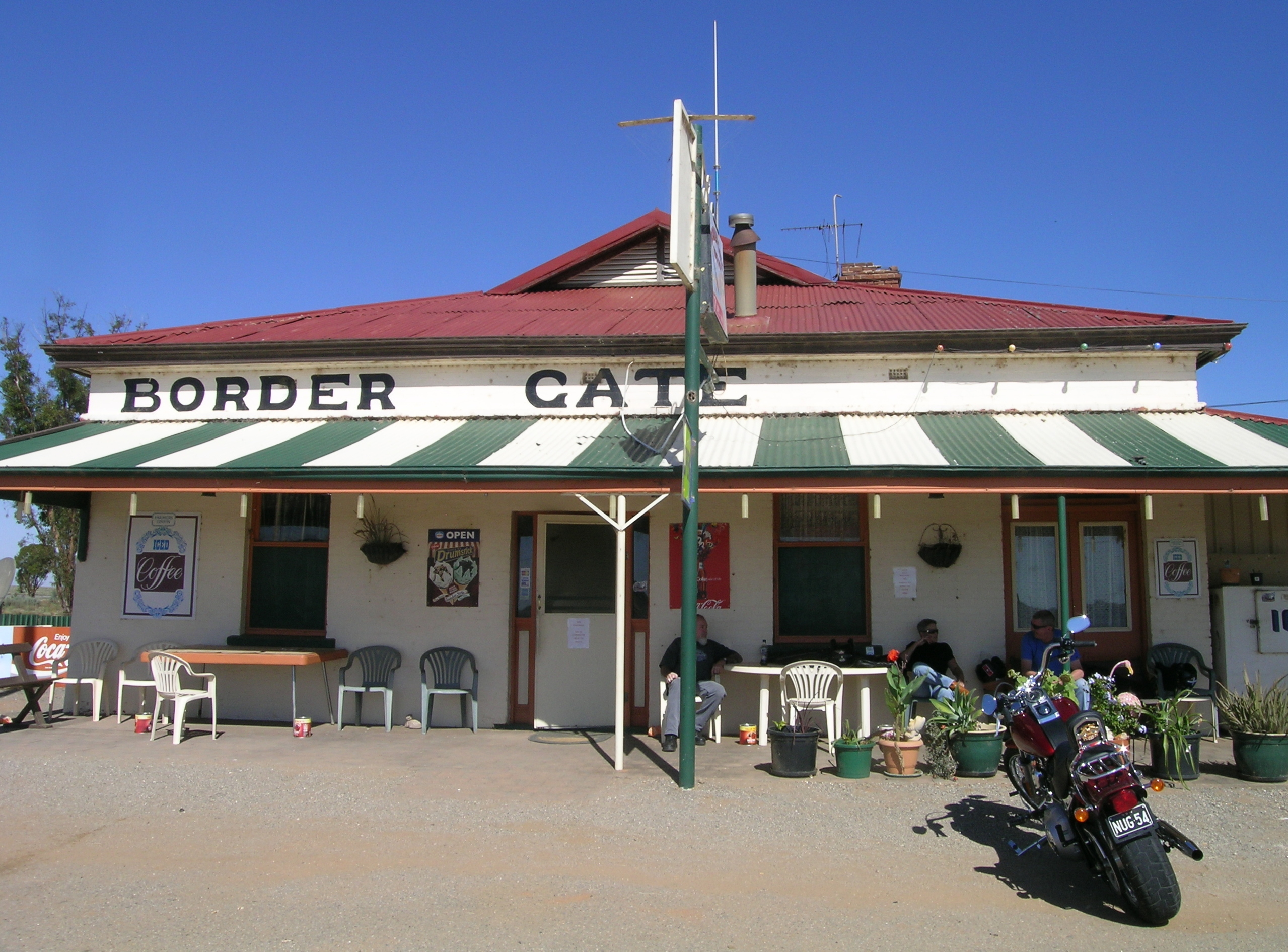
- The former Border Gate Hotel, on the Barrier Highway only metres over the border in New South Wales, had a distinct trading advantage when South Australian hotels closed at 6 pm but NSW hotels closed four hours later

- Coordinates: 32°04′44″S 140°59′47″E
- Country: Australia
- State: South Australia
- Region: Far North
- LGA: Pastoral Unincorporated Area
- Location: 462 km (287 mi) NE of Adelaide; 50 km (31 mi) W of Broken Hill
- Established: 29 April 1886 (town); 29 May 1997 (locality)

Government
  - State electorate: Stuart
  - Federal division: Grey
- Elevation: 213 m (699 ft)

Population
  - Total: 12 (SAL 2021)
- Time zone: AEST (Eastern New South Wales)
Localities around Cockburn
Mulyungarie	Mulyungarie	Tibooburra, New South Wales
Mulyungarie	Cockburn	Broken Hill, New South Wales
Pine Creek Station	Pine Creek Station	Unincorparated Far West

Cockburn (/ˈkoʊbərn/ KOH-bərn) is a town and locality in the east of the Australian state of South Australia immediately adjacent to the border with New South Wales near Broken Hill. It was established because the New South Wales government refused to allow locomotives of the South Australian Railways to operate in its jurisdiction, requiring locomotives to be changed at the town for 84 years until 1970, when the route was converted from 1067 mm (3 ft 6 in) to 1435 mm (4 ft 8 1/2 in) standard gauge.

Huge ore deposits were discovered in Silverton, which in 1884 prompted the government of South Australia to offer to the Government of New South Wales the building of a narrow gauge railway line from the limit of its jurisdiction at the border to Silverton, since horse-drawn drays over rough tracks could not meet the transport task for the journey to Port Pirie. This offer was rejected by the New South Wales government. In response, investors formed the Silverton Tramway Company in 1885 to build the railway line from Silverton to the border. The town of Cockburn came into existence in 1886 on the South Australia side of the border as a place for trains to exchange locomotives and crews. On the New South Wales side of the border, the Silverton Tramway Company built the Burns station and transfer sidings.

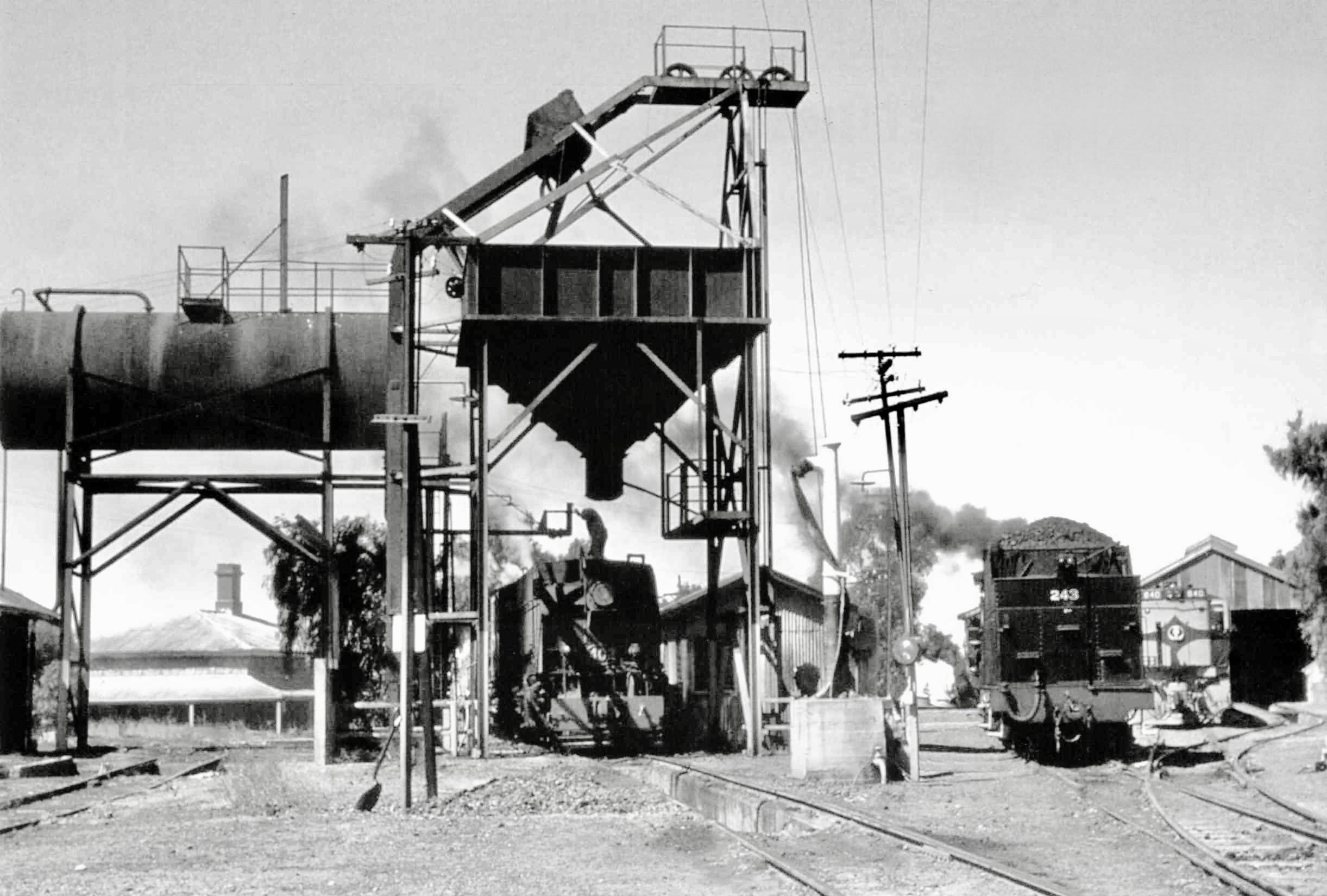
For 84 years until 1970, Cockburn exemplified a busy South Australian Railways interchange station. Locomotives were serviced here and concentrate trains brought from Broken Hill on the Silverton Tramway were marshalled for their 350-kilometre (220-mile) journey to Port Pirie.

Pressure for the expansion of Cockburn was increased with mineral discoveries at Thackaringa and Umberumberka from 1883 onwards. The silver-lead-zinc discovery at Broken Hill led to the railway line being extended from Silverton to Broken Hill in 1887. The route was extremely important, as it provided balanced trading for locomotives with a momentum grade 'up' from Broken Hill to Cockburn and a rising grade 'down' from Cockburn to Broken Hill. This was the main advantage of the route to and from Cockburn.

By 1892, the town of Cockburn had become sizeable, with a population of 2000. Cockburn boasted two hotels, two general stores, three boarding houses, schools, and churches. It included within its business sector a blacksmith, butcher, baker, produce merchant and carrier. Stationed at Cockburn were two engineers, a stationmaster, customs officer, locomotive superintendent and a miner. A locomotive shed and related work facilities were recorded as existing in 1892. Seven trains regularly ran between Petersburg (now Peterborough), Cockburn and Broken Hill, and included passenger trains. 83,194 passengers travelled through Cockburn in 1892.

Cockburn also has a role in industrial relations history in Broken Hill. Tom Mann, a political "disruptionist", was barred from speaking publicly in New South Wales. In 1908, 3000 passengers came from Broken Hill to Cockburn to hear him speak. From the front of the hall, next to the Cockburn Hotel, he addressed the crowd. This was the beginning of a dispute known as the 1909 lockout. Broken Hill mining unionists were locked out of the company gates for rejecting pay cuts which would have been below the minimum wage.

The standard gauge railway line, officially opened in 1970, is south of the surveyed town limits of Cockburn. A new station and a passing loop were built but the station is now disused.

The 2016 census recorded a population of 56 in the immediate vicinity of the town.

Nothing remains of the infrastructure of the railway yard other than an elevated locomotive water tank, repurposed as a bushfire emergency asset. Several non-residential buildings, such as the former dining room and barracks, have also been re-purposed. The last residential buildings, six railway employee houses, were demolished or removed in 2009.

== Governance ==
Cockburn is located within the federal division of Grey, the state electoral district of Stuart and the Pastoral Unincorporated Area of South Australia. As of 2025, the community within Cockburn received municipal services from a South Australian government agency, the Outback Communities Authority.
