= Parish of Albert =

Civil parish in New South Wales, Australia

- Parish
- Location in New South Wales, Australia
- Coordinates: 30°06′34″S 142°21′33″E
- Country: Australia
- State: New South Wales
- County: Yantara County

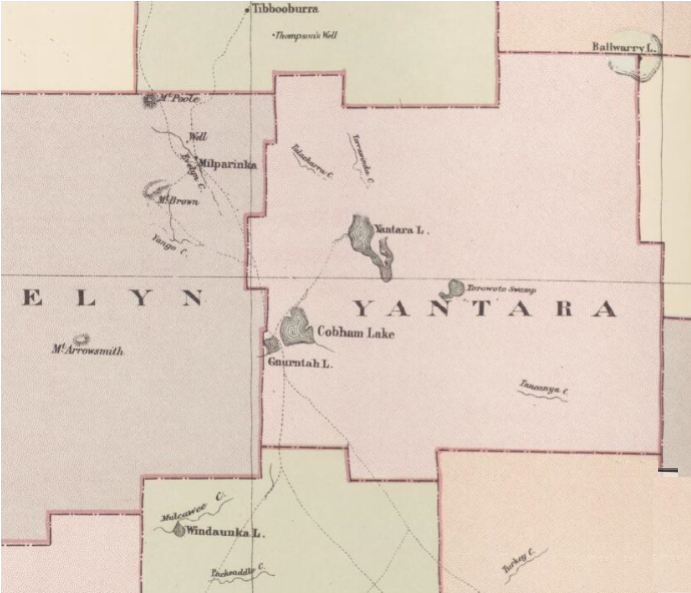
Map of Yantara County, New South Wales,

Albert Parish, New South Wales is a remote civil parish of Yantara County near Milparinka, New South Wales.

The parish is on the Silver City Highway where the road meets Salt Lake, New South Wales. The parish has a Köppen climate classification of BWh (Hot desert).

Gold was discovered there, and for a while a village at Albert had a population of 900. but the gold soon ran out and life in the parish is very hard as it is arid and has no reliable fresh water.

== See also ==
- Albert, New South Wales
- Lake Albert, New South Wales
- Albert Parish (Delialah County), New South Wales
- Albert Parish (Yancowinna County) New South Wales
- Albert, (Drake County) New South Wales
- Albert, (Kennedy County) New South Wales
- Albert, (Macquarie County) New South Wales
- Albert, (Sandon County) New South Wales
- Albert, (St Vincent County) New South Wales
