= Burns, New South Wales =

Former railway village in New South Wales

Coordinates: 32°05′S 141°00′E

Burns, New South Wales is a former small village, now comprising only two houses and a roadside café, in the Unincorporated Far West of New South Wales. It was established as the transfer point for rail freight vehicles between the Silverton Tramway and the South Australian Railways, necessitated by the New South Wales Government's refusal to allow South Australian trains to operate in its state. Cockburn, immediately over the border, was the corresponding transfer point in South Australia.

The Barrier Highway, main Sydney-to-Adelaide railway line and the now defunct Silverton Tramway, all pass within 100 metres (110 yards) of Burns.

The topography is flat and sparsely vegetated. The district has a Köppen climate classification of BWh desert.

== History ==
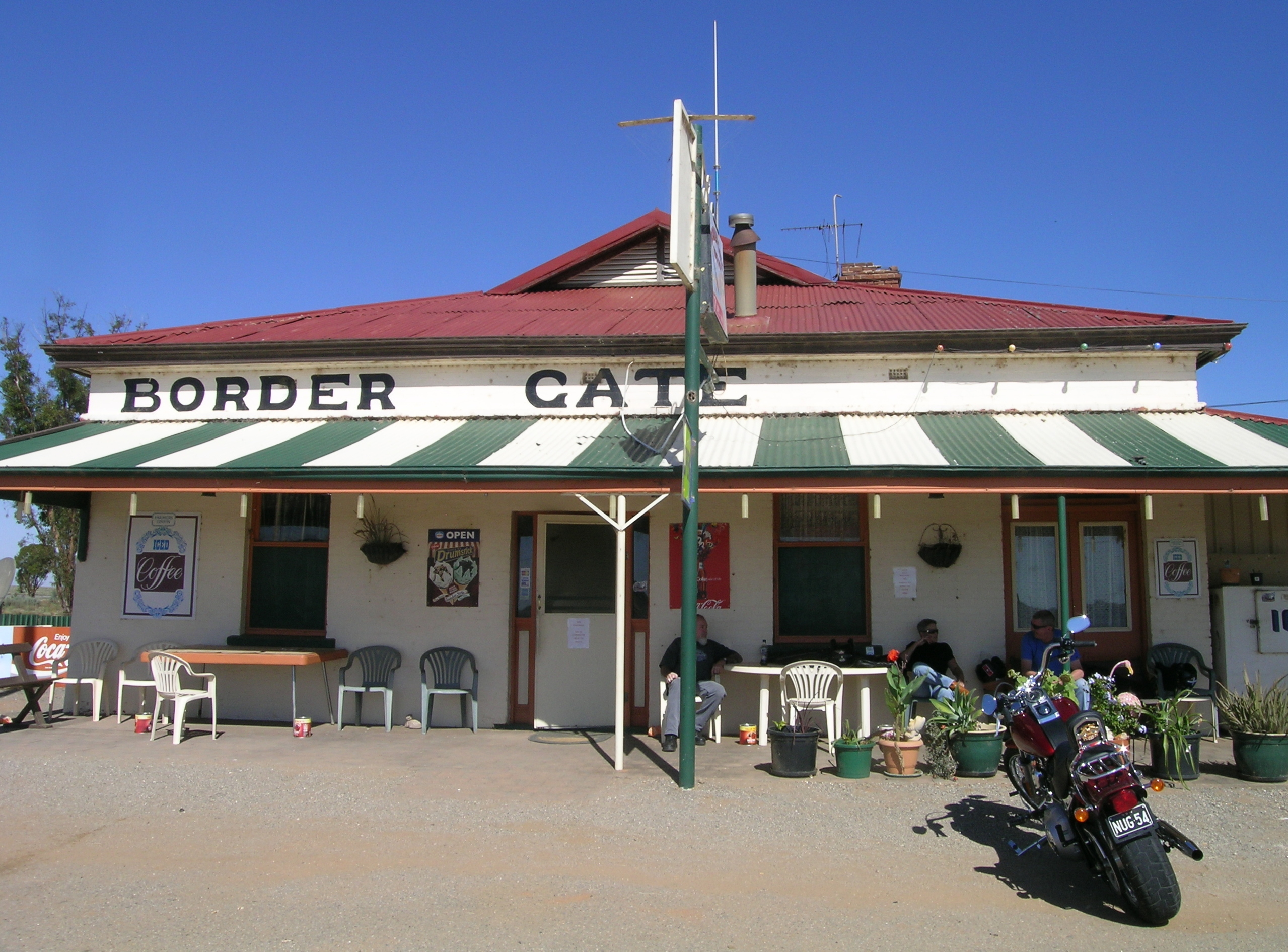
The Border Gate roadhouse is only metres inside New South Wales. For decades, when it was a pub, it benefited greatly from having longer trading hours than South Australian hotels

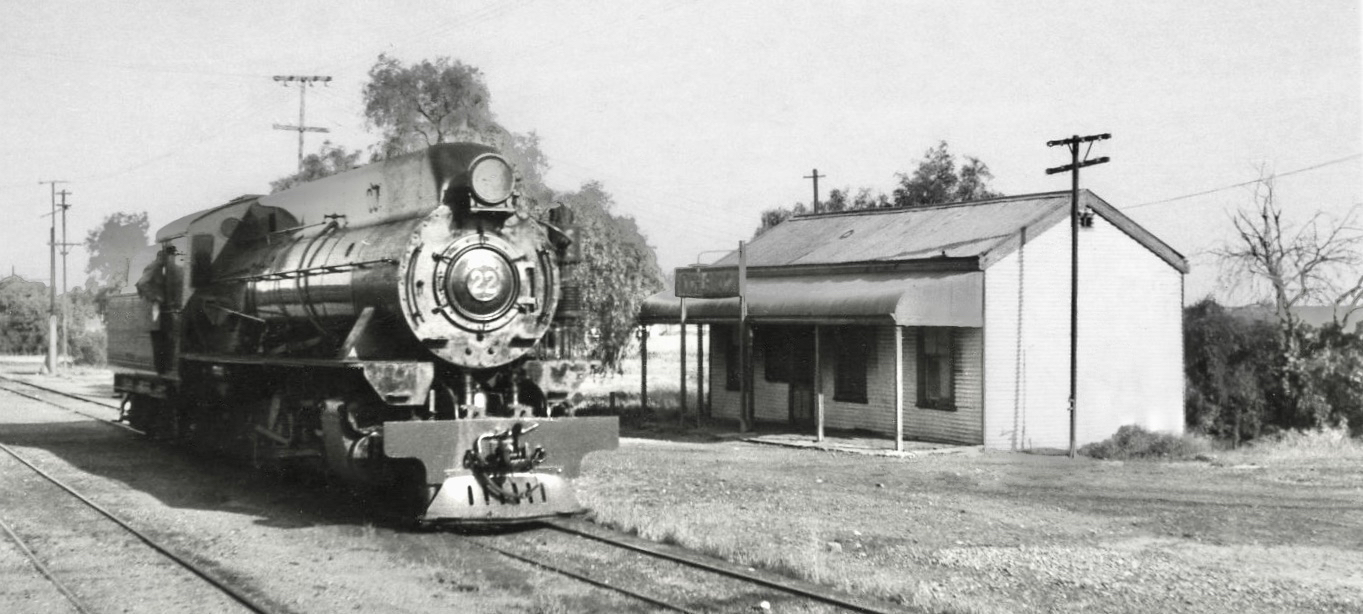
Silverton Tramway Company W class locomotive no. 22 next to the Burns station building in 1965

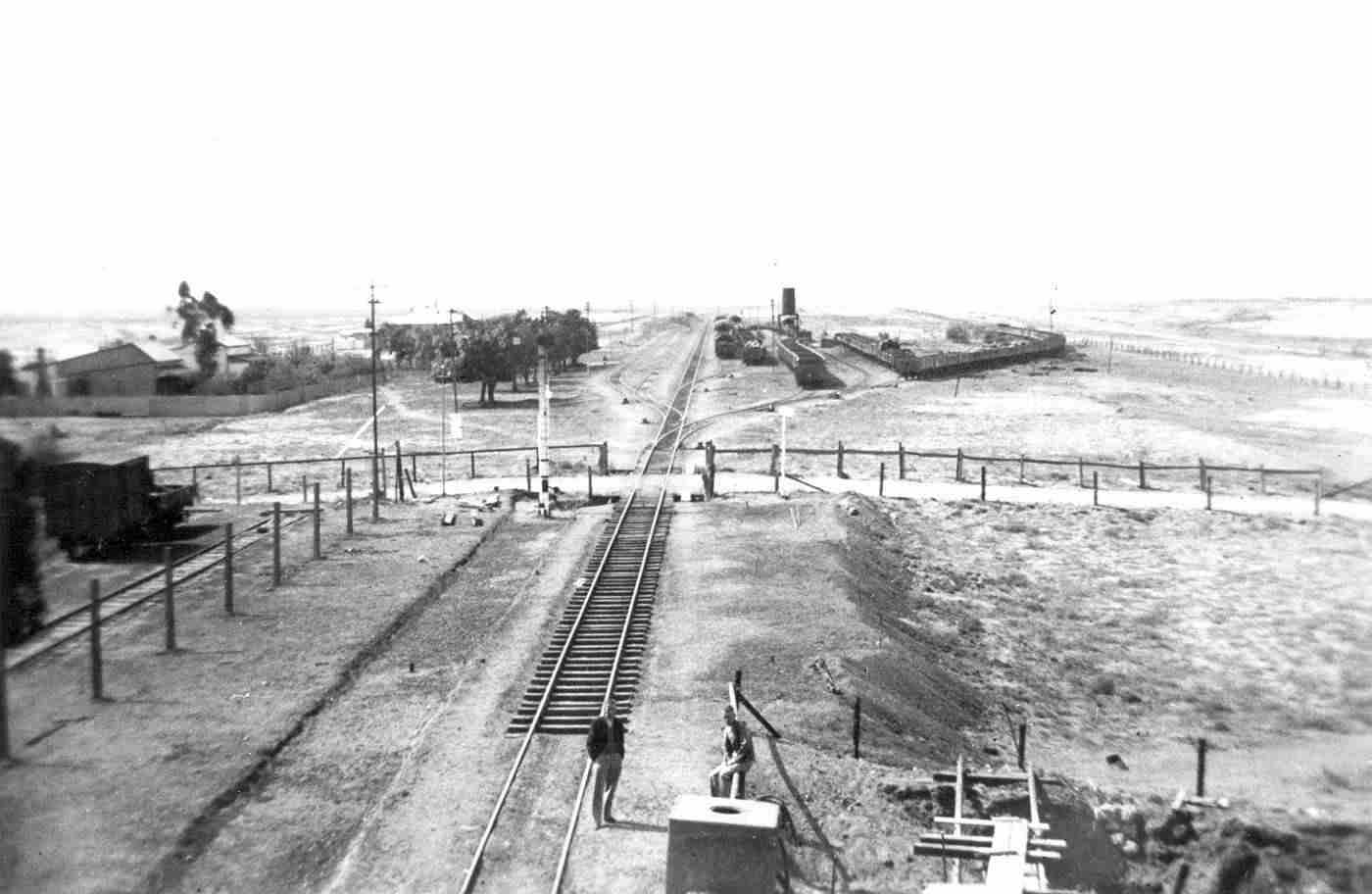
The Burns rail yard, New South Wales, in 1939 – looking east from the Cockburn railway yard, in South Australia

Burns is located on the traditional lands of the Wiljali people.

The township was laid out as a grid of five by six streets, but due to the location and harsh environment it never developed beyond a small village of railway employee houses. When the Silverton Tramway was closed in 1970, all but two of the houses were either sold in situ or removed and sold at a more accessible place.

Burns was the location of an astronomical station.
