= Thackaringa =

Rural locality in New South Wales, Australia

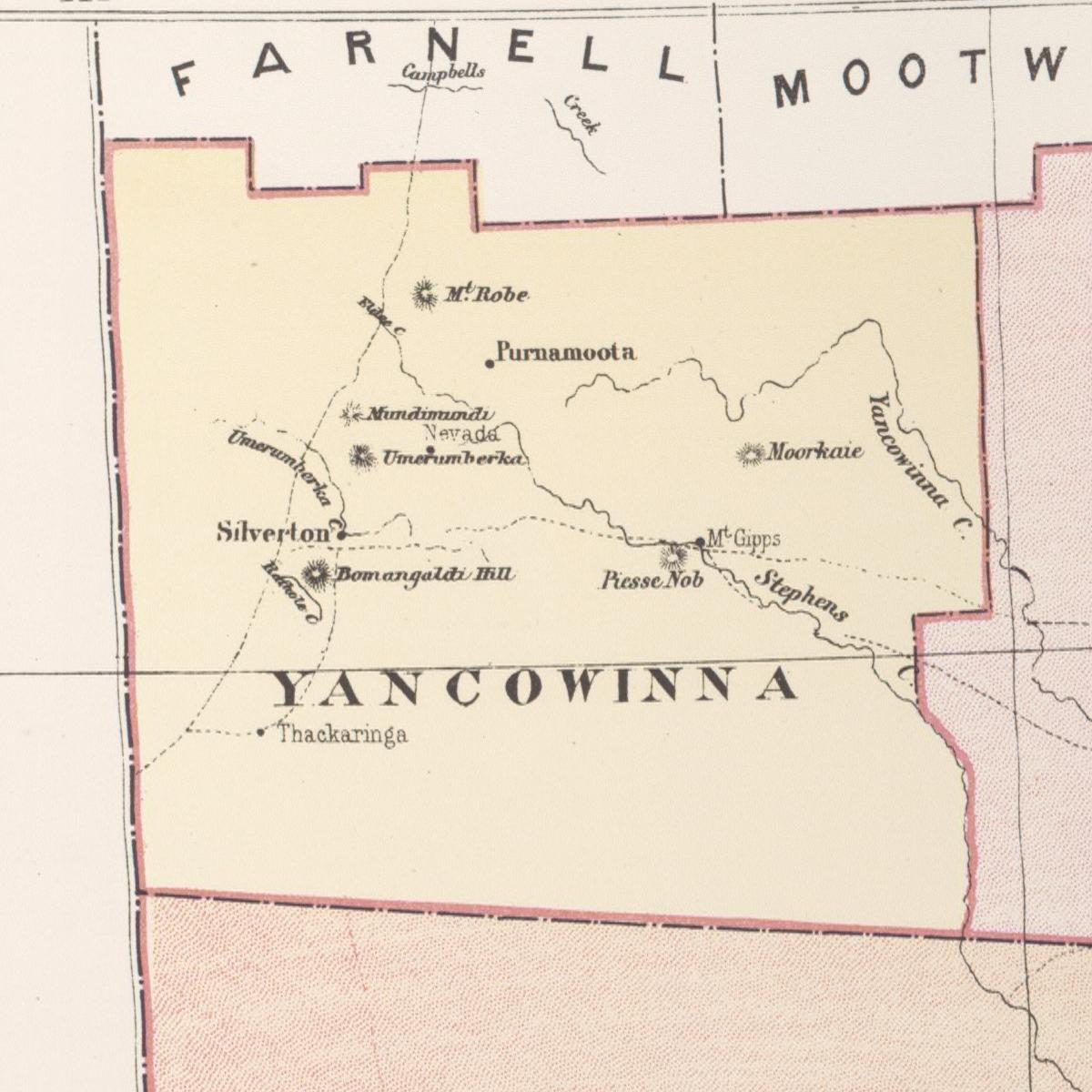
Yancowinna, shown in a map from 1886.

Thackaringa is a rural locality, civil parish, railway stop and cattle station in Far Western New South Wales.

== Location ==
Thackaringa is located at 141.0623°, −32.0245°, 489.263 km from Sydney and between Cockburn, South Australia on the border with South Australia and by Silverton in the north-east. Thackaringa is at an altitude of approximately 204m.

== Geography ==
Thackaringa is arid and sparsely settled, with the economy mainly dependent on broad-acre agriculture, though some mining occurs.

Thackaringa was on the former Silverton Tramway, which ran between Broken Hill and the South Australian border, and Thackaringa railway station operated from 2 January 1889 until 12 January 1970.

The nearest town is Cockburn, South Australia.

=== Geology ===
The northern part of the district is cut by a large retrograde shear zone containing large garnets and refractory minerals.... There are many other small mineral deposits found in the Thackaringa district where quartz veins and/or granitic rocks have crystallised including the Thackaringa davidite belt and pods of large rutile crystals.

=== Climate ===
Thackaringa has a Köppen climate classification of BWh and BWk desert.

== History ==
The Parish is part of the traditional lands of the Wiljali people.

The area was opened by Europeans due to the discovery of minerals in the 19th century. There was a grazing property, known as Thackaringa Station, and the first discovery of silver ore in the area was made there in 1875, by Julius Nickel who was digging a well. In 1888, the population of Thackaringa was between 200 and 300 people. Silver, lead, feldspar and beryl are still extracted in the area today.
