= Mundi Mundi =

Pastoral lease in New South Wales

Coordinates: 31.885°S 141.038°E

Location in New South Wales

Mundi Mundi Station, also known as Mundi Mundi Plains Station or Mundi Mundi Pastoral Run, was a pastoral lease that operated as a sheep station in New South Wales. Originally around 600 sq mi (1,600 km^{2}), the property was sold off and broken up into smaller properties in the late 1970s. The present-day Eldee Station, Purnamoota Station, and Belmont Station are all situated on crown land that was formerly part of the Mundi Mundi Pastoral Run. There is also an area known as the Mundi Mundi Plain(s), and a scenic viewpoint over the plains called Mundi Mundi Lookout in the Barrier Ranges to the east, on Eldee Station. Mundi Mundi Mount is 400 m (1,300 ft) above sea level.

Numerous films, television ads, music videos, and fashion shoots have been filmed on Belmont Station, which is also the location of the annual Mundi Mundi Bash, a music festival.

== History ==
Mundi Mundi is one of the four original stations in the Barrier Range settled through the early 1870s, along with Mount Gipps, Corona, and Alberta Stations. The property was established by the Whitting family, who were running stock in the area from the 1860s when the property had an occupied an area of 372,000 acres (150,543 ha) or 600 sq mi (1,600 km^{2}). The Whittings were running sheep but also were raising horses. The family were the first Europeans to settle in the Barrier Range and their daughter, Tryphena, was the first European to be born in the area.

John Lewis had cattle stolen from the property in 1901. Lewis still owned the property in 1906, when he and other pastoralists in the area formed the Pastoralists' Association of West Darling. Lewis had also once owned other runs such as Nilpena, Wirrealpa, and Nelyambo.

In 1930 the property was carrying 12,000 sheep. Following a drought in 1943, the station manager, J. D. Kelly, sold off 7,100 sheep from the property, leaving a flock of 9,000.

In the late 1970s the Crown lease for Mundi Mundi had come up for review. The government decided that this prime grazing land – which had been so well managed with stock rotation, compared to aerial photographs of the adjoining properties – would not benefit from renewing the Crown Lease. The adjoining properties would however benefit, as they were in such dire state, the government was convinced they could become more viable if each took a portion of the Mundi Mundi Station land. In effect, the careful management of the Mundi Mundi Station property was not rewarded. The property at that time was owned by Innes and Colin McLeod (he being the heir of M.S. McLeod, the tyre and rubber family from Adelaide). His wife Innes McLeod simultaneously ran the Silverton Hotel until 2021 when she sold it.

The formal compulsory acquisition process commenced for Mundi Mundi Station around 1978-79 and the services of A.J. Schutz & Associates (valuers from Adelaide) assessed the property on behalf of McLeod for compensation.

The Silverton Wind Farm was built in the Barrier Ranges to the east of Mundi Mundi Plain, by AGL Energy, on land that is part of Belmont Station. Operation began in 2018 and it reached full output 2020.

== Today ==
The present-day Eldee, Purnamoota, and Belmont stations are all situated on crown land that was formerly part of the Mundi Mundi Pastoral Run. The Mundi Mundi Ruins, dating from the 19th century and including the old homestead, a water tank and well and graves, lie on Dense Camp Creek between Belmont and Eldee Stations. The site is of historical significance, and possibly deserving of assessment as a state heritage site.

The Mundi Mundi Plain(s) stretch to the west of the Barrier Ranges and Eldee Station, north of Silverton. There is a scenic viewing spot known as the Mundi Mundi Lookout in the Barrier Ranges to the east, which affords a view across the plain. The lookout is on Eldee Station, which is around 10 minutes drive from the town of Silverton. Mundi Mundi Mount is 400 m (1,300 ft) above sea level.

Belmont Station, located on the Mundi Mundi Plains, has been in the hands of several generations of the same family since the 1980s or earlier. As of 2024 the leaseholder was John Blore, who had been on the property for 44 years.

== Film location ==
"Mundi Mundi Plain Station" (sic) is described as "an iconic film location", covering an area of around 69,000 ha (170,000 acres), with 24,000 ha (60,000 acres) of the property lying in the adjoining state of South Australia, approximately 41 kilometres (25 mi) west of Broken Hill and 142 kilometres (88 mi) north west of Menindee, situated just outside of Silverton. It is described as a both flat and mountainous area.

Belmont Station been the location of many films as well as television ads, music videos, and fashion shoots since the 1980s or earlier. TV commercials include 1980s and 1990s campaigns by XXXX Castlemaine Beer and McCain Foods. Films include the 1984 horror film Razorback by Russell Mulcahy and Spirits of the Air, Gremlins of the Clouds, by Alex Proyas (1989). The 1999 Jimeoin film The Craic is set in a fictional town called Mundi Mundi, although the "Mundi Mundi Pub" is actually the nearby Silverton Hotel. The last scenes of Mad Max 2 are filmed at the lookout, and The Adventures of Priscilla, Queen of the Desert also used the location. Furiosa: A Mad Max Saga, directed by George Miller and released in 2024, was filmed on Belmont Station. The film employed up to 1,000 crew on site during filming.

== Mundi Mundi Bash ==
The Mundi Mundi Bash, a music festival, has been held on Belmont Station since 2022 (although the first was planned for 2021 (Note: Some sources say 2021, with one saying it was postponed until September that year owing to the COVID-19 pandemic.)). The event was founded by Greg Donovan, who also runs the Birdsville Big Red Bash. In 2022, it was held twice, in April and August, attracting crowds of under 10,000 people. The inaugural event had been postponed from 2021 owing to the COVID-19 pandemic, initially being postponed until September of that year.

In 2023 it was held for three days from 17 to 19 August. Icehouse, Hoodoo Gurus, Human Nature, Pete Murray, The Angels, and Kate Ceberano all performed at the festival, and it was reported that 6,594 people participated in breaking the world record for the most people performing the Nutbush dance to the Ike & Tina Turner song "Nutbush City Limits". The event sold out, hosting around 12,000 attendees. A five-year agreement with the leaseholders was signed in 2023, enabling the organisers to build some permanent structures, such as composting toilets.

The event was again held from 15 to 17 August 2024, with around 14,000 people attending. Daryl Braithwaite, Vanessa Amorosi, and Tim Finn were the headline acts, along with The Living End, Ian Moss, Chocolate Starfish, Björn Again, Shane Howard, Casey Barnes, Ash Grunwald, and others.

Another festival is scheduled for 2025, featuring Diesel, James Reyne, Mark Seymour, Richard Clapton, Baby Animals, Missy Higgins, Hoodoo Gurus, The Cat Empire, Birds of Tokyo, Kasey Chambers, Leo Sayer, Rose Tattoo, Chocolate Starfish, and many others.

The festival boosts the economy of Broken Hill, and attendees book out accommodation and camping sites such as Penrose Park Recreation Reserve and Menindee Lakes Caravan Park. The newly upgraded Broken Hill racecourse is also opened for camping. The event is held in a former claypan used as a paddock for goats, known as "Mundiville". The event is an example of "agritourism", with the leaseholders diversifying to increase income to offset the costs of drought, a constant threat in the region. The event is family-friendly, and dogs are permitted. The festival's charity partner is the Royal Flying Doctor Service.

== See also ==
- List of ranches and stations
- List of reduplicated Australian place names
