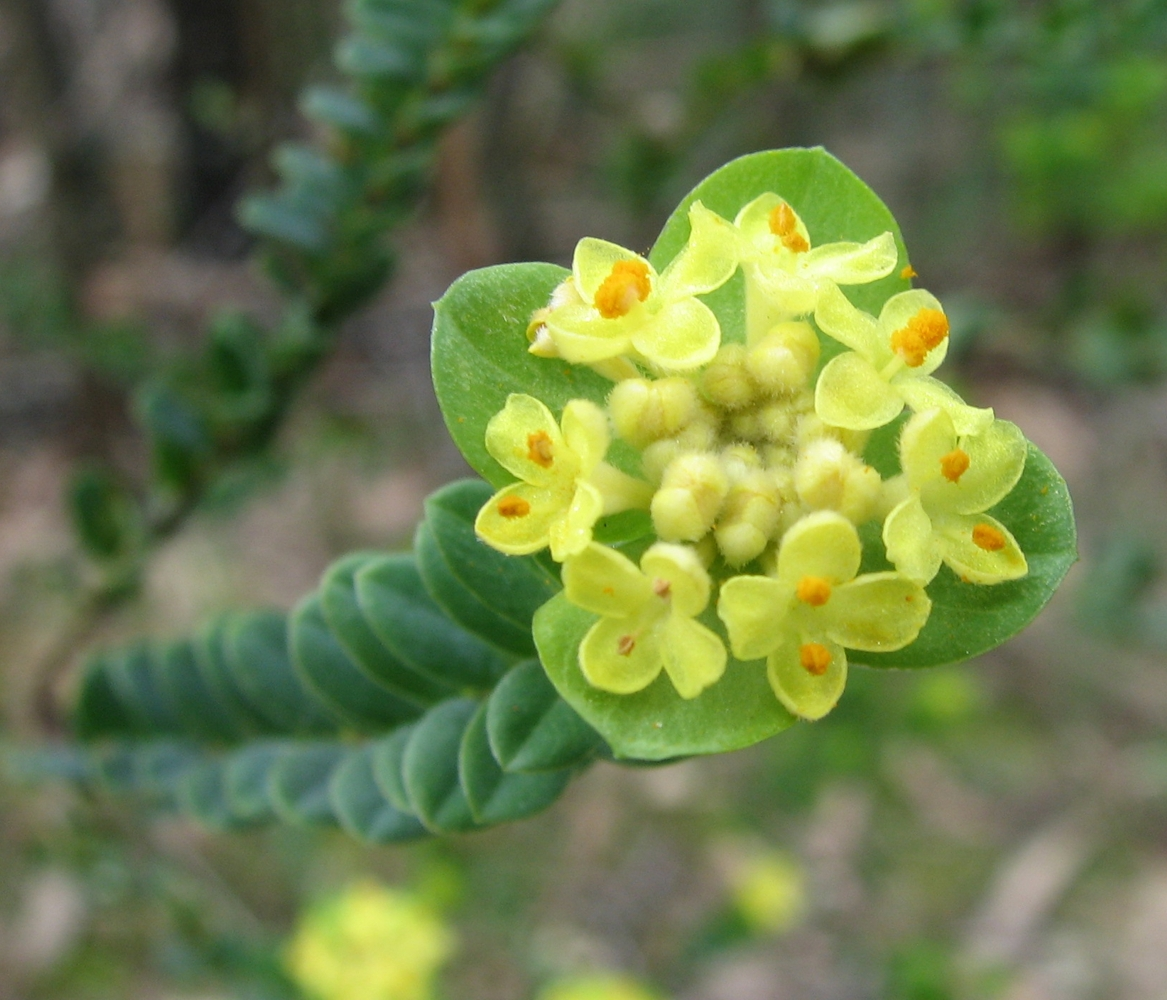
- Pimelea flava subsp. flava

Scientific classification
- Kingdom: Plantae
- Clade: Tracheophytes
- Clade: Angiosperms
- Clade: Eudicots
- Clade: Rosids
- Order: Malvales
- Family: Thymelaeaceae
- Genus: Pimelea
- Species: P. flava

Binomial name
- Pimelea flava R.Br.

Subspecies
- Pimelea flava subsp. dichotoma (Schltdl.) Threlfall; Pimelea flava R.Br. subsp. flava

Synonyms
- Banksia flava (R.Br.) Kuntze; Calyptrostegia flava (R.Br.) Endl.

= Pimelea flava =

Species of plant

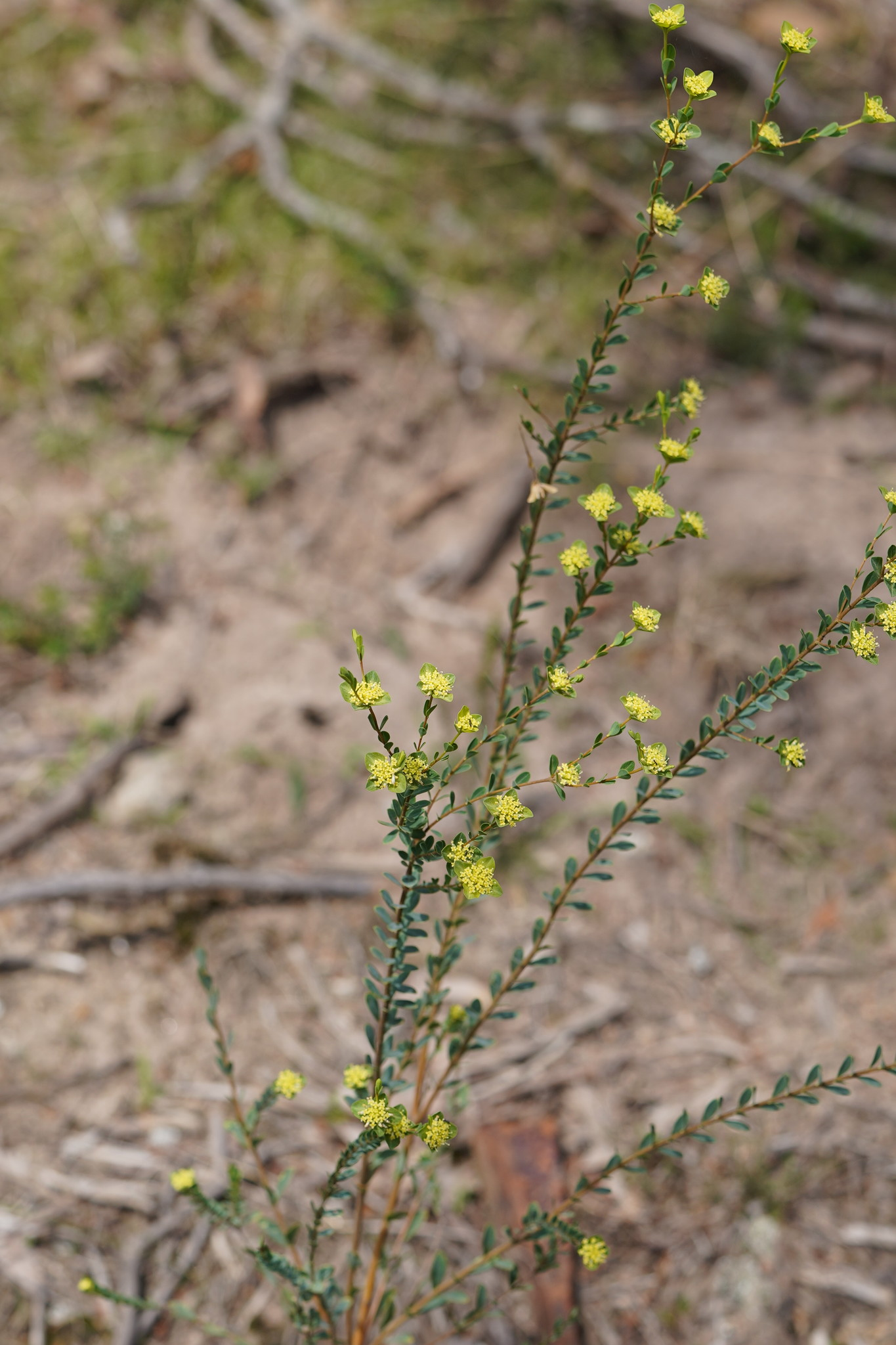
Habit of subsp. flava

Pimelea flava is a species of flowering plant in the family Thymelaeaceae and is endemic to south-eastern Australia. It is a shrub with narrowly elliptic to egg-shaped leaves arranged in opposite pairs, and compact clusters of 9 or more flowers with 2 or 4 elliptic to circular involucral bracts at the base. The flowers and bracts are white or yellow, depending on subspecies.

== Description ==
Pimelea flava is a shrub that typically grows to a height of 0.3–2.5 m (1 ft 0 in – 8 ft 2 in) and has hairy young stems. The leaves are arranged in opposite pairs, often crowded, narrowly elliptic to egg-shaped with the narrower end towards the base or almost circular, 2–10 mm (0.079–0.394 in) long, 1–6 mm (0.039–0.236 in) wide on a short petiole and glabrous. The flowers are arranged in compact clusters of 9 to many on the ends of branches on a peduncle 1–10 mm (0.039–0.394 in) long, with 2 to 4 leaf-like, elliptic, leaf-like involucral bracts 3–16 mm (0.12–0.63 in) long and 2–10 mm (0.079–0.394 in) wide. Each flower is either male or female, hairy, yellow or white, depending on subspecies. The floral tube is 2–6 mm (0.079–0.236 in) long, the sepals 1–3 mm (0.039–0.118 in) long and the stamens shorter than the sepals. Flowering mainly occurs from August to December.

== Taxonomy ==
The species was first formally described in 1810 by Robert Brown in his Prodromus Florae Novae Hollandiae. The specific epithet (flava) means "yellow".

In 1847, Diederich Franz Leonhard von Schlechtendal described Pimelea dichotoma in the journal Linnaea, but in 1983, Threlfall reduced it to Pimelea flava subsp. dichotoma in the journal Brunonia. That name, and that of the autonym are accepted by the Australian Plant Census:

- Pimelea flava subsp. dichotoma (Schltdl.) Threlfall, commonly known as diosma rice-flower, usually grows to a height of 0.3–0.5 m (1 ft 0 in – 1 ft 8 in) has green involucral bracts and white flowers.
- ''Pimelea flava R.Br. subsp. flava commonly known as yellow rice-flower, usually grows to a height of 0.5–2.5 m (1 ft 8 in – 8 ft 2 in) has green to yellowish involucral bracts and yellow flowers.

== Distribution and habitat ==
Diosma rice-flower (subsp. dichotoma) grows in sand or heavier soil, often in mallee shrubland and occurs from the Eyre Peninsula in South Australia to near West Wyalong in New South Wales and to the Grampians in Victoria. Yellow rice-flower (subsp. flava) mainly grows in sandy soil and is found from the Yorke Peninsula in South Australia to East Gippsland in Victoria and from the south-east to the north of Tasmania.

== Conservation status ==
Yellow rice-flower is listed as "rare" in Tasmania under the Tasmanian Government Threatened Species Protection Act 1995.
