= Barrier Ranges =

Mountain range in New South Wales, Australia

Barrier
- Stanley's Barrier Range
- Location within New South Wales

Highest point
- Peak: Mount Robe, 31.656680°S 141.326776°E
- Elevation: 472 m (1,549 ft); AHD
- Coordinates: 31°42′S 141°15′E

Geography
- Country: Australia
- State: New South Wales
- Range coordinates: 31°30′S 141°30′E

The Barrier Ranges or sometimes the Barrier Range and historically the Stanley's Barrier Range, is a mountain range that comprises a series of hills and higher grounds in the far western region of New South Wales, Australia, surrounding the city of Broken Hill.

== Location and features ==
The Barrier Ranges comprise the whole system of ranges and ridges associated with the main watershed named the Main Barrier Range - including Coko Range, Floods Range, Slate Range, Robe Range, Mundi Mundi Range, Coonbaralba Range and Mount Darling Range. The city of Broken Hill lies within these ranges.

The ranges are oriented in a roughly north-south direction, east of the border between New South Wales and South Australia. Their topography is slightly higher ground lying between lower lands along the Darling River and in South Australia. The ranges contain numerous mineral deposits, most notably Broken Hill.

It was reported in October 1856 that "within the last year or two numerous sheep-stations have been opened in the Barrier Ranges, affording a reasonable prospect, not only of increased pastoral wealth, but also of the gradual development of the mineral resources of the district and its ultimate settlement."

== Etymology ==
In 1844, during his third and final expedition, Charles Sturt named the range "Stanley's Barrier Range" in honour of Lord Stanley. The Barrier Highway and various local organisations in Broken Hill derive their names from the name of this range.

== Geology ==
Sir Douglas Mawson investigated the Precambrian rocks of the Barrier Ranges. There are metamorphic, igneous, and sedimentary rocks along the ranges, with varying degrees of mineralisation. Mawson identified two groups: an older Archaean ("Willyama") Series, and a newer, Proterozoic ("Torrowangee") Series. His work in this area was reported in his doctorate thesis in 1909 for the University of Adelaide, and he subsequently published "Geological investigations in the Broken Hill area", in 1912, co-authored by English geologist Walter Howchin.

== See also ==
- List of mountains in Australia § New South Wales
