= Silverton, New South Wales =

Village in outback Australia

Silverton
- Town
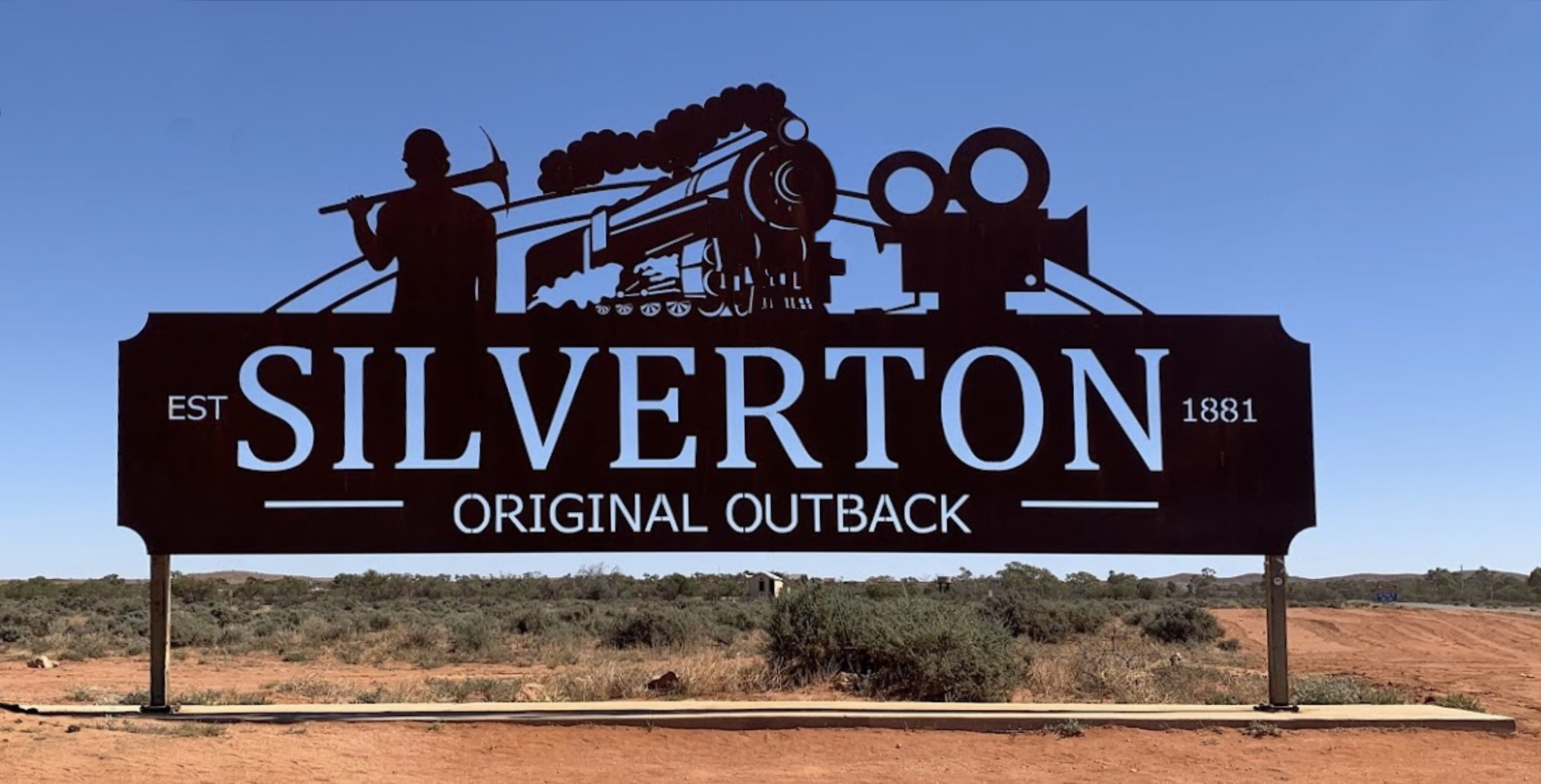
- Town entry sign at Silverton

- Coordinates: 31°52′S 141°14′E
- Country: Australia
- State: New South Wales
- LGA: Unincorporated Far West Region
- Location: 1,172 km (728 mi) W of Sydney; 539 km (335 mi) NE of Adelaide; 26 km (16 mi) NW of Broken Hill

Government
  - State electorate: Barwon
  - Federal division: Parkes

Population
  - Total: 48 (SAL 2021)
- Postcode: 2880

Silverton is a village at the far west of New South Wales, Australia, 26 kilometres (16 mi) north-west of Broken Hill. At the 2021 census, Silverton had a population of 48.

Silverton sprang up after the discovery of rich silver deposits, although it was soon eclipsed by an even richer silver-lead-zinc ore body at nearby Broken Hill. It is often referred to as a ghost town; however, there remains a small permanent population and a few businesses, mainly related to tourism.

== History ==
The earliest human settlers in the area are thought to be the Wiljakali people. Their presence was probably only intermittent due to lack of permanent water sources. As in much of Australia, a combination of disease and pressure from European settlement drove them from their lands.

The first European to visit the area was the then-Surveyor General of New South Wales, Major Thomas Mitchell, in 1841. Three years later, the explorer Charles Sturt saw and named the Barrier Range while searching for an inland sea; the range was so named as it was a barrier to his progress north. Burke and Wills passed through the area in their famous 1860–61 expedition, setting up a base camp at nearby Menindee. Pastoralists first began settling the area in the 1850s, with the main trade route to the area along the Darling River.

Prospectors began working in the area in 1867 when a local station-hand claimed to have found gold there. It was later discovered that his plan was merely a pretext for stealing a horse.

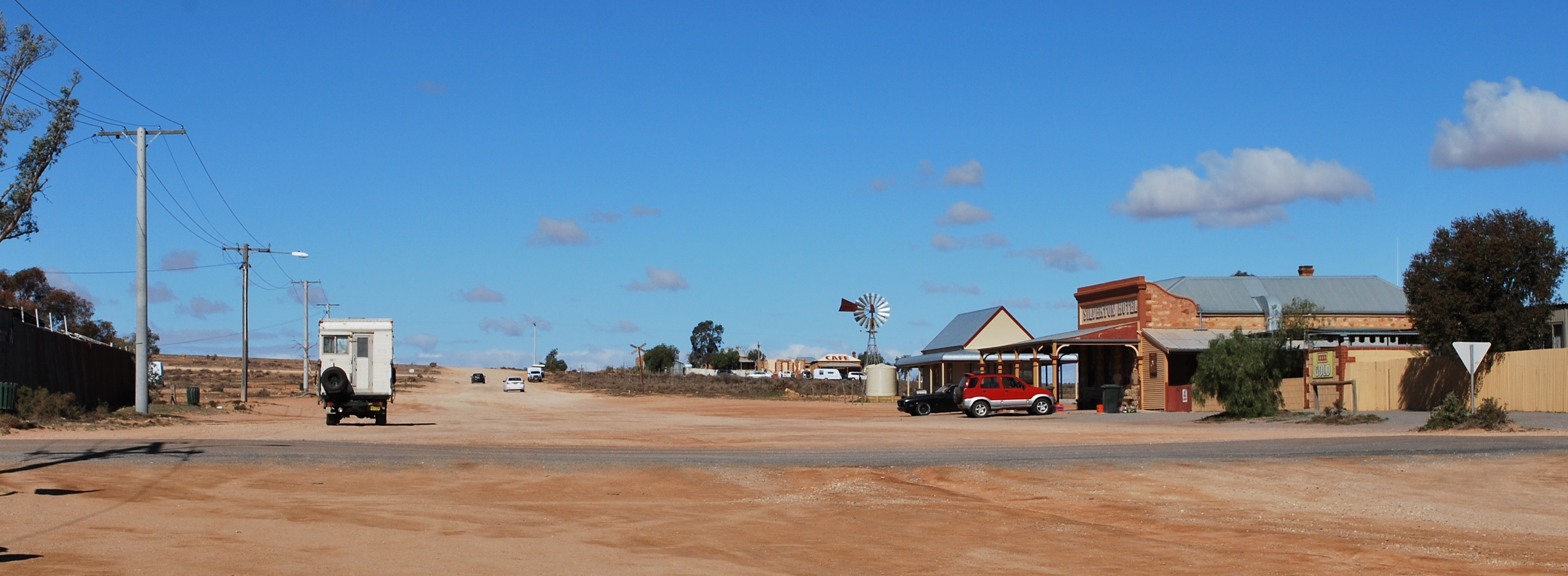
The main crossroads in Silverton, with the Silverton Hotel on the right

Some years later in 1875, two men drilling a well on a station south of the town site hit a lode of silver. Silverton was proclaimed a town on 17 September 1880 and Richard O'Connell was sent to be in charge of the police. Among his many other duties was Acting Clerk of Petty Sessions, Mining Registrar and Warden's Clerk.

In October 1886, the Silverton Municipal Council was formed. It held its inaugural meeting in January 1887 in the Silverton Municipal Chambers, which still exist. The town's population quickly increased reaching a peak of about 3000 in the 1890s as a result of mineral discoveries. To convey the ore concentrates more efficiently than by animal haulage, a company opened a railway line called the Silverton Tramway in 1888 to connect the town to the South Australian border, where South Australian government trains took the ore to Port Pirie for smelting.

Rapid depletion of the high-grade ore around Silverton, along with the discovery of an even richer silver-lead-zinc ore body in nearby Broken Hill led to a sudden decline in Silverton's population. Many people departing took their homes with them since they were of simple iron and canvas construction.

The Municipality of Silverton was formally dissolved on 24 September 1907 by a proclamation of New South Wales governor Harry Rawson; however, by then it had been effectively defunct for several years.

=== 20th century ===
By 1901, the town and immediate area was home to fewer than 300 people. Nevertheless it remained popular as a venue for recreational outings by Broken Hill residents. In 1915, the Battle of Broken Hill took place when a New Year's Day picnic train from Broken Hill to Silverton was attacked by two armed men, one from Afghanistan and the other from modern-day Pakistan.

=== Penrose Park ===
Penrose Park, named after John Penrose, a pioneering brewer at Silverton, was the attraction for these picnic excursions. Located beside Umberumberka Creek in a rare belt of greenery on Silverton's outskirts, it was not so much a product of the early mining era at Silverton as of the mining boom at Broken Hill. In 1893, a bid to have a racecourse there was, however, unsuccessful.

After decades of use as a picnic ground, Penrose Park remained relatively neglected until the mid-1930s, when Broken Hill mining companies decided it was an admirable recreation site for their employees. Money was spent on upgrading sporting facilities, playgrounds and parklands, such that throughout the 1940s and 50s it became a major recreational facility. Huge annual picnics and fairs were held there by social and sporting clubs, and by mining companies. For example, it was reported that the eighth annual Zinc Mine employees' picnic in 1941 attracted one fifth of the entire town of Broken Hill. Convoys of family cars between Broken Hill and Penrose Park were so frequent that it became one of the first sealed roads outside Broken Hill. By the mid-1960s, interest began to wane, as did support from the mining companies, and the park fell into slow decline. The park, renamed as Penrose Park Recreation Reserve, now has camping facilities. During the annual Mundi Mundi Bash each August, the campground fills up with people attending the music festival at Belmont Station.

== Demographics ==
In the 2021 Australian census, Silverton's population was 51.9% male and 48.1% female, with a median age of 58. It had a total of 12 families in 35 private dwellings with a median household income of $1375 per week.

== Present day ==
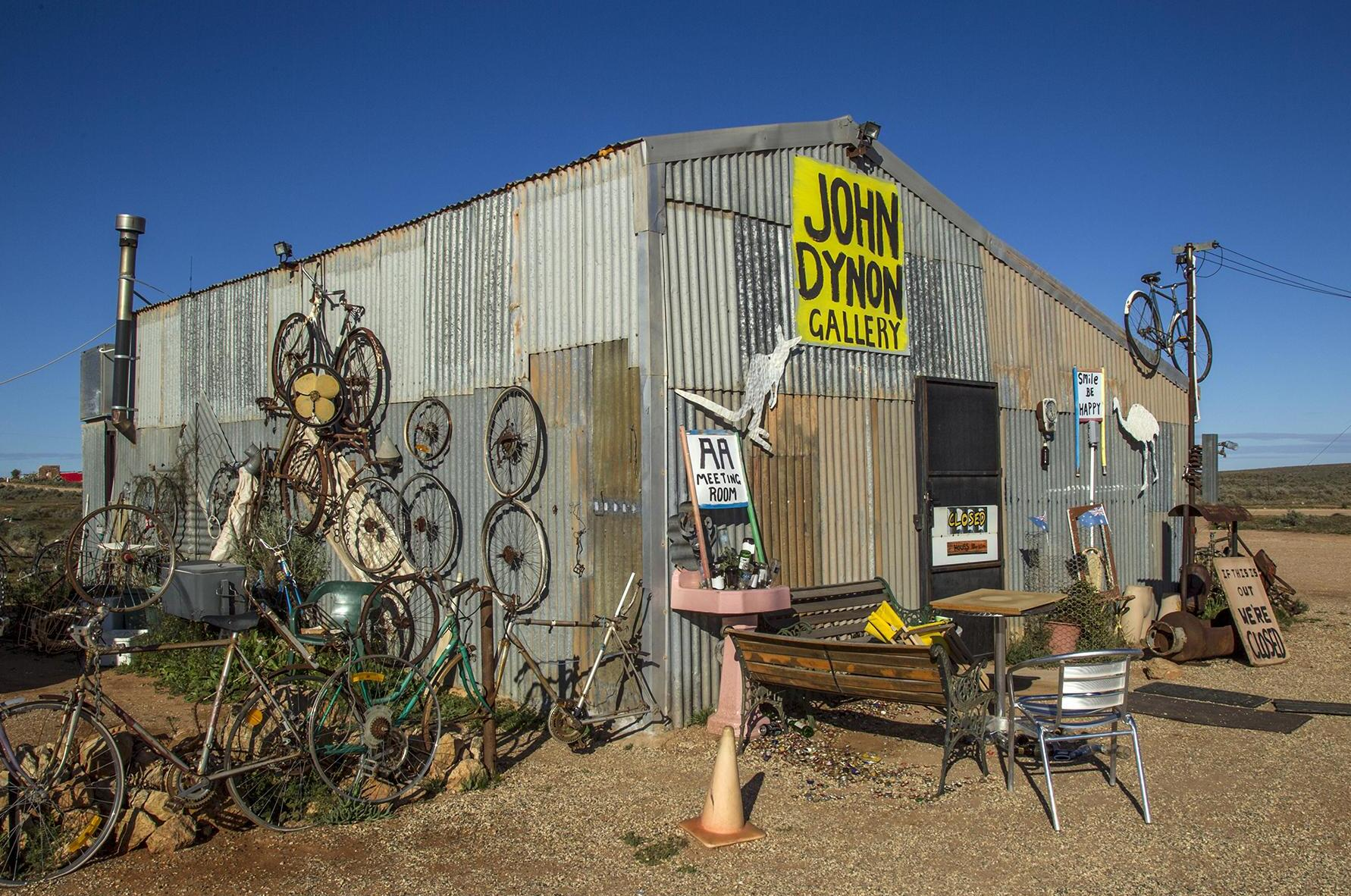
The John Dynon Gallery

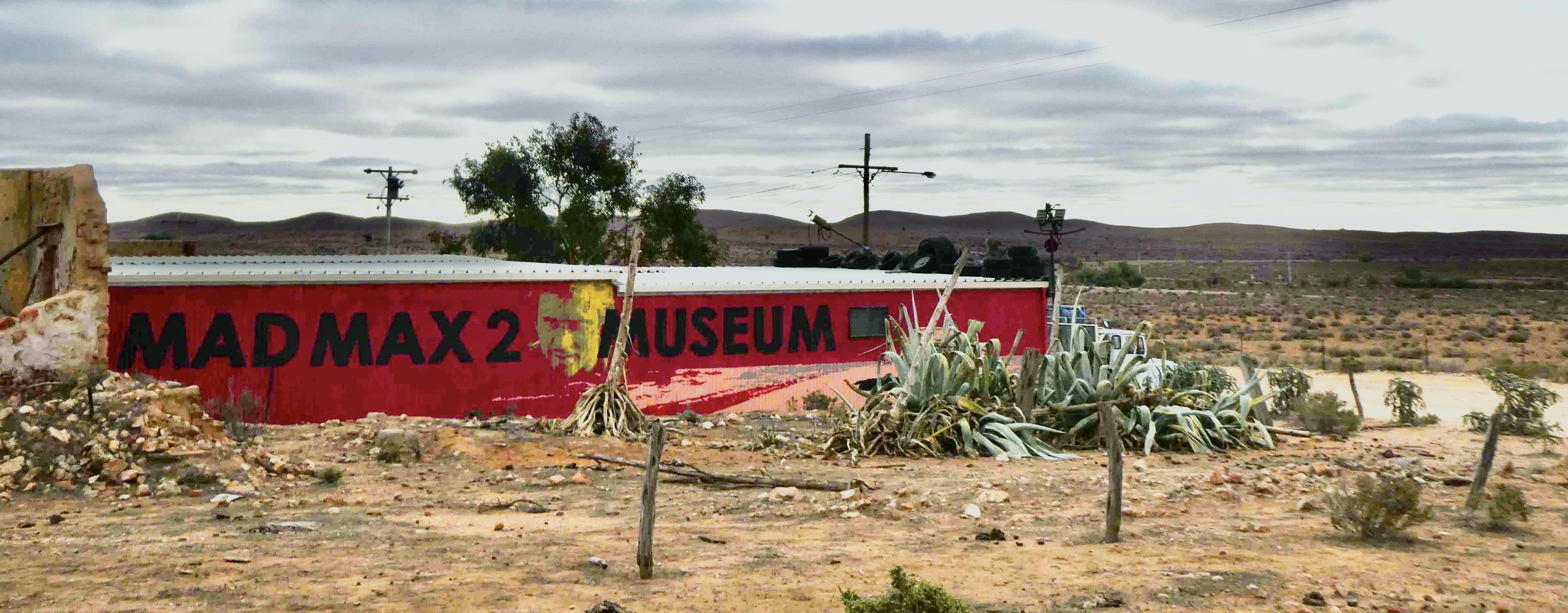
Mad Max 2 Museum

Silverton today is inhabited by a permanent population of only about 50 people, but its history and location make it a relatively popular tourist destination. Several artists live in or around the town, including Peter Browne, Albert Woodroffe and John Dynon, with some maintaining their own galleries. This is in line with the significant number of artists working out of nearby Broken Hill, as the surrounding landscape and lighting is particularly amenable to the creation of art.

Most of the original buildings have now vanished or lie in ruins, but there are some interesting buildings that remain, including the Silverton Hotel and the former Silverton Gaol. By 2007, Silverton had been the scene for more than 140 films and commercials thanks to the clear light, the character-filled colonial buildings and the scenic desert surrounds. The hotel has been seen in several productions, and its inside walls are covered with memorabilia. These productions include Razorback, The Adventures of Priscilla, Queen of the Desert, The Flying Doctors, and Dirty Deeds. There is a privately owned Mad Max 2 museum that pays homage to the motion picture that was filmed in the region.

Just outside the township is the Silverton cemetery, (Note: 31.874°S 141.232°E.) which has 402 identified grave sites in an area of 42 acres (17 ha).

== See also ==
- Silverton Wind Farm
