= Wilyakali =

Aboriginal Australian people of western New South Wales and NE South Australia

Wilyakali Lands
- Location within New South Wales
- Location: New South Wales
- Nearest city: White Cliffs
- Coordinates: 31°08′48″S 142°22′53″E

The Wilyakali or Wiljaali are an Aboriginal Australian people of around the Darling River basin in Far West of New South Wales, as well as west of the state border, into South Australia. Their traditional lands centred on the towns of Broken Hill and Silverton and surrounding country.

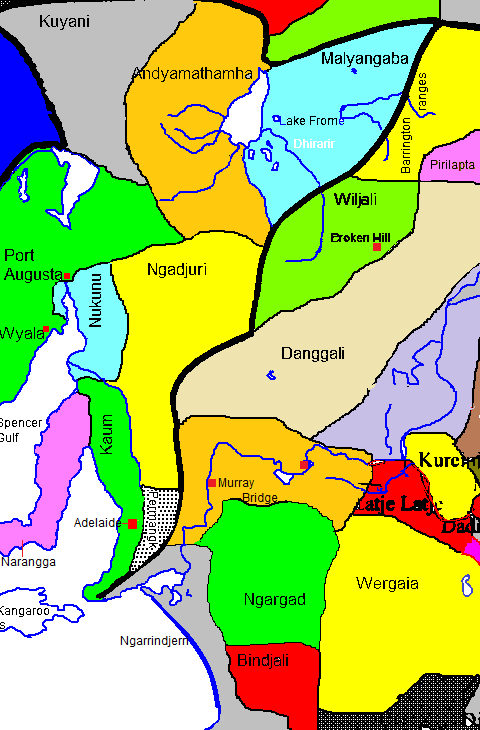
Traditional lands of the Wilyakali ("Wiljali")

== Etymology ==
Etymologically the word kali appears to be an archaic term meaning "people" and is incorporated in numerous tribal names of the Darling River valley, including Paakantyi ("creek people"), Bula-ali ("hill people") and Thangkakali. In this construction, the name would mean the Wilya people.

== History ==
=== Arrival of Europeans ===
The ethnographer A. W. Howitt that the Wiljakali tribe that was declared extinct during the early 1900s but is believed to have died out before acknowledgement by the federal government at the time in 1913–1915. Belonged to a distinct supra-tribal group he called the Itchumundi nation, believed to have become extinct in the early 1800s due to disease brought by British settlers.

=== Land corporation ===
In the 1980s, the people formed the Wilyakali Aboriginal Corporation. This corporation today runs Poolamacca Station and has also gone on to negotiate mining deals, and native title claims

== Country ==
Wilyakali traditional lands covered an estimated 8,400 square miles (22,000 km^{2}) from the Barrier Ranges westwards to Olary in South Australia. They encompassed Silverton, Mutooroo, and Boolcoomata. To the northwest they reached Mootwingee, and northeast to just south of Sturt Meadows. The tribe apparently moved south in the first half of the 19th century from its earlier domain to resist strong-arm cultural pressures from the Ngadjuri to adopt circumcision.

The Malyangapa lived on their northern tribal borders, while the Yardliyawara were to their west.

=== Native title ===
A native title claim covering thousands of square kilometres, including agricultural land as well as several small towns along the Barrier Highway, was lodged in 2012 by Maureen, Glen, and Dulcie O'Donnell, on behalf of the Wilyakali people. Native title was finally formally recognised on 28 August 2023, in a decision handed down by Justice Elizabeth Raper.

== Wilyakali language ==
The Wilyakali language is part of the Paakantyi language group, which is nearly extinct.

== Traditional culture ==
Traditional Wilyakali adopted many cultural influences from people to their north and west, such as mura stories, before they had vanished during the era of the removal of Indigenous children by government from their native lands.

According to A. P. Elkin, Wilyakali kinship system terms bore some overlap with those of the Wadikali.

== Mutawintji National Park ==
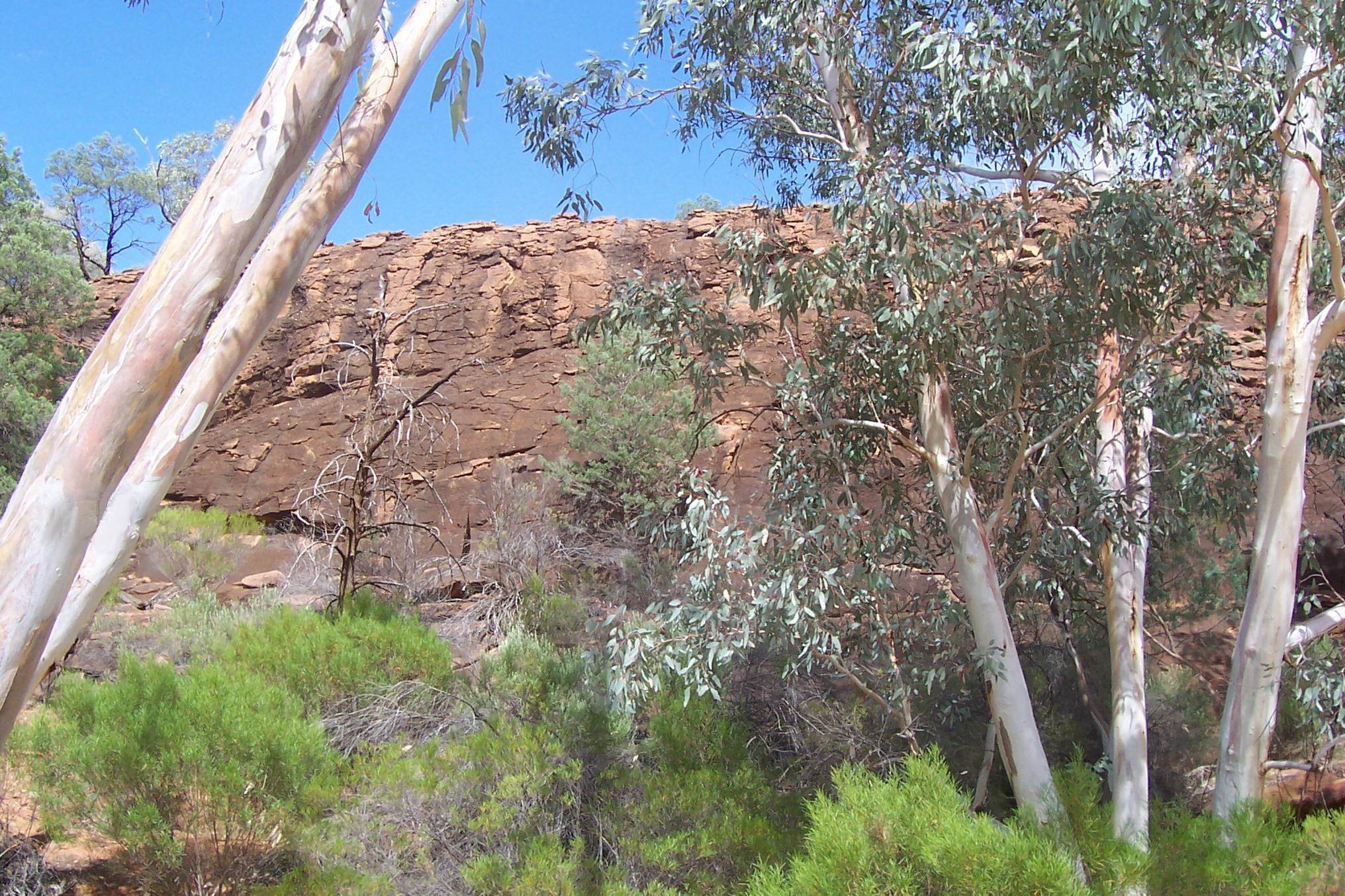
Mutawintji and river red gums

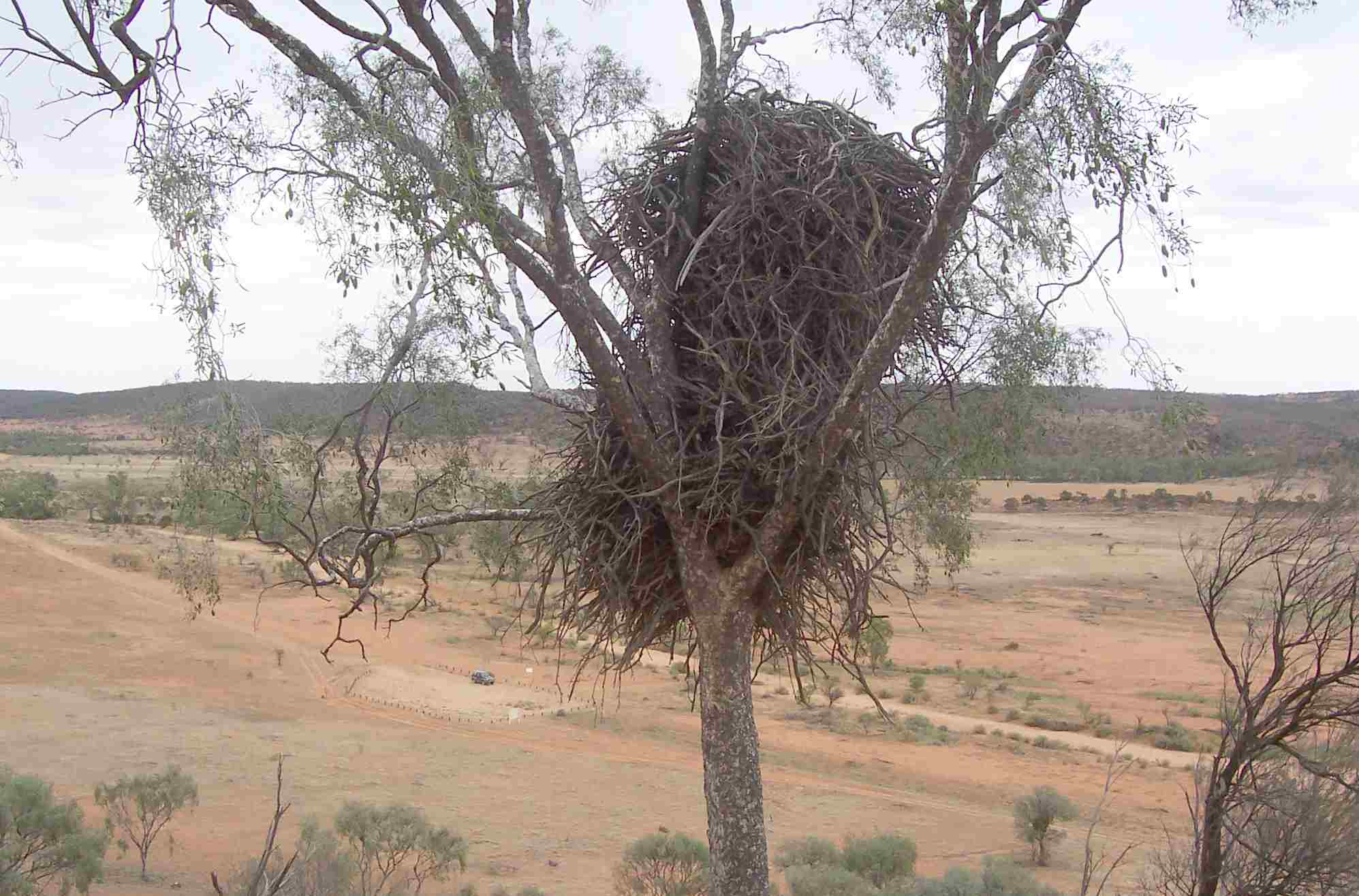
Mutawintji and eagle nest in Flindersia tree

The Wilyakali are joint managers of the Mutawintji National Park, which is the first national park handed back to the believed traditional owners in NSW.

== Areas of cultural significance ==
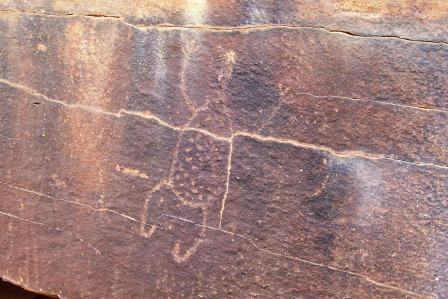
Petroglyph in Wilyakali country

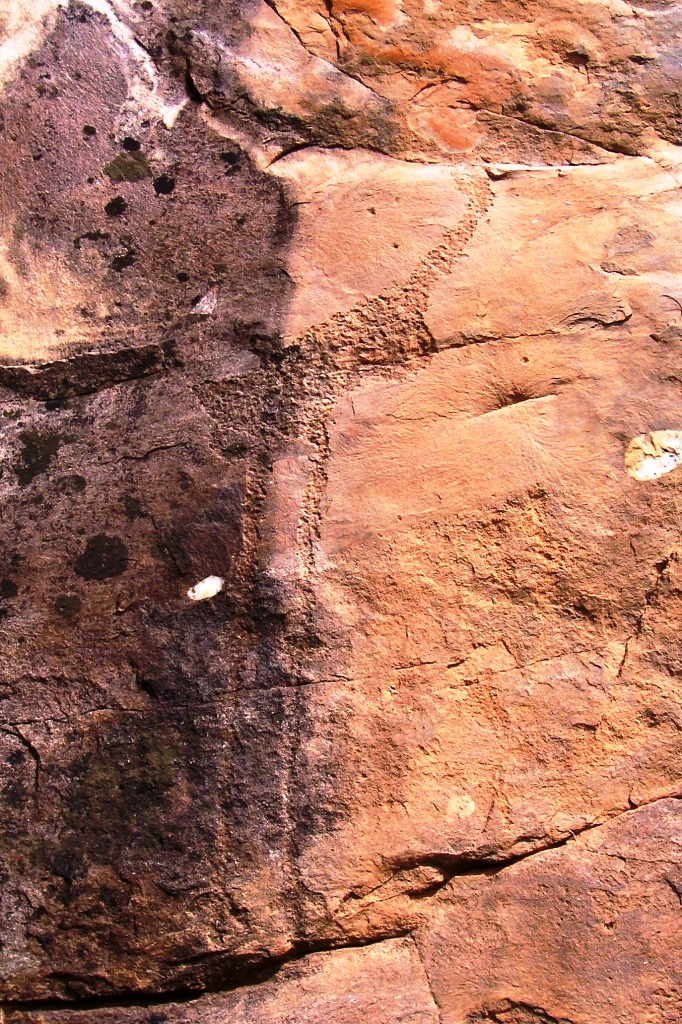
Petroglyph of a brolga in Wilyakala country

Traditional places of cultural significance include Mutawintji gullies.

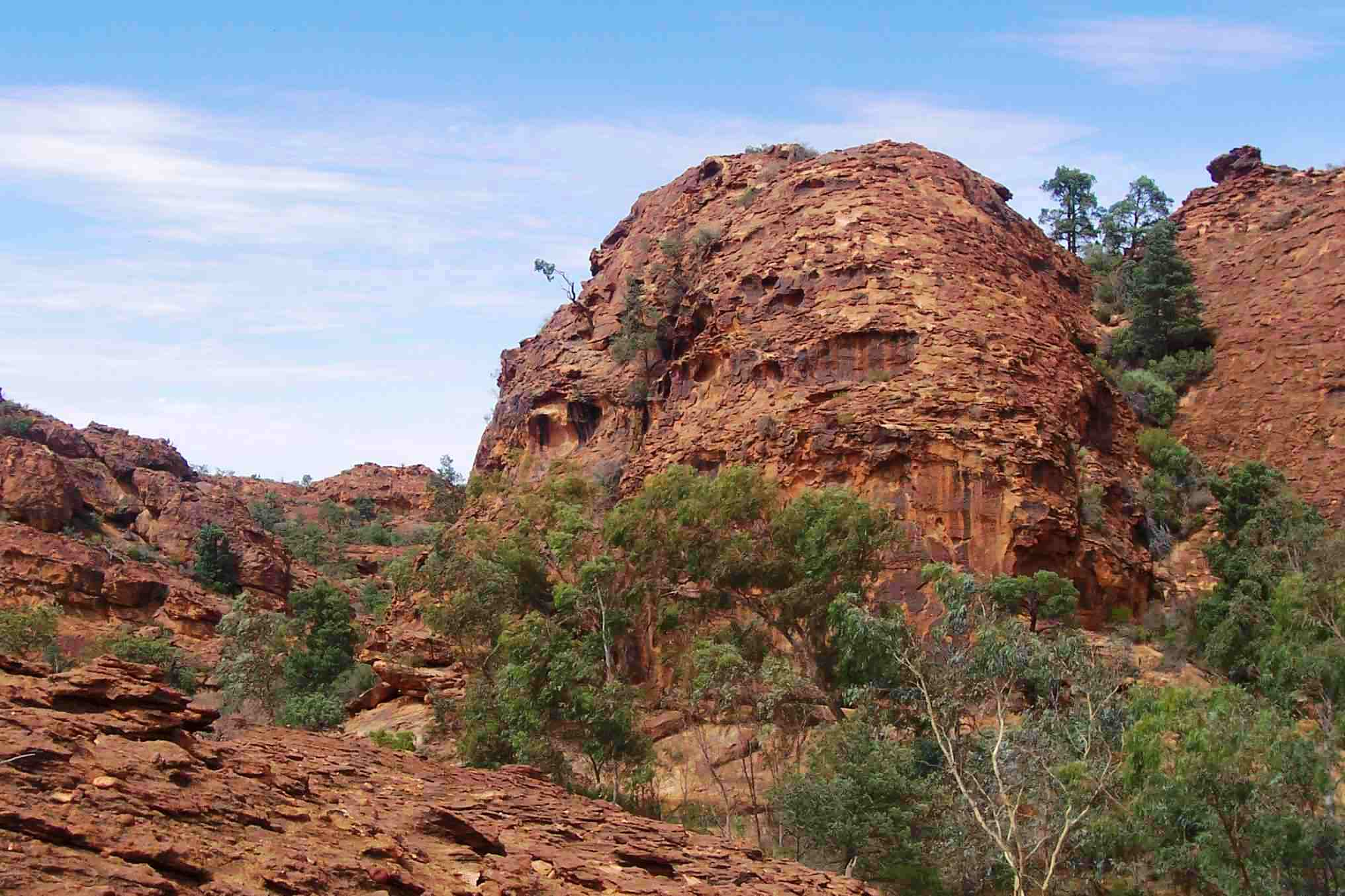
Mutawintji Dome

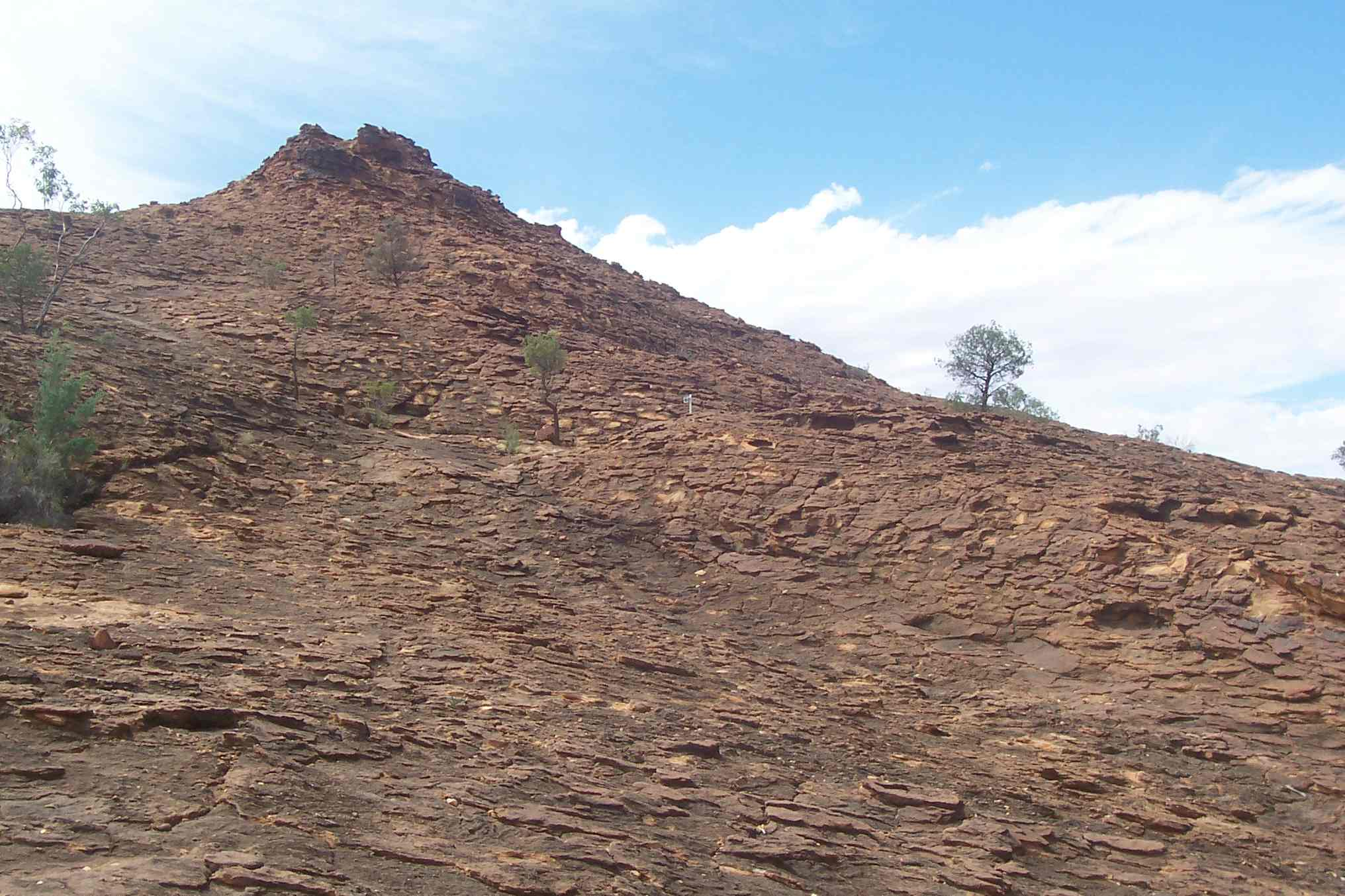
Mutawintji & exposed rock

== Alternative names ==
- Bo-arli, Bulali ('Hill people', from bula, hill)
- Wiljagali
- Wiljakali
- Wiljali
- Willoo

Source: Tindale 1974

== Sources ==
- Beckett, Jeremy; Hercus, Luise (2009). The Two Rainbow Serpents Travelling: Mura Track Narratives from the 'Corner Country'. Australian National University Press. ISBN 978-1-921-53693-9.
- Elkin, A. P. (September 1938). "Kinship in South Australia (Continued)". Oceania. 9 (1): 41–78. doi:10.1002/j.1834-4461.1938.tb00216.x. JSTOR 40327699.
- Hercus, Luise; Austin, Peter (2004). "The Yarli Languages". In Bowern, Claire; Koch, Harold (eds.). Australian Languages: Classification and the comparative method. John Benjamins Publishing. pp. 207–222. ISBN 978-9-027-29511-8.
- "Sacred Sites Mutawintji Dreaming Tracks". Madonna Magazine. 30 April 2004. Archived from the original on 30 April 2004.
- Tindale, Norman Barnett (1974). "Wilyakali". Aboriginal Tribes of Australia: Their Terrain, Environmental Controls, Distribution, Limits, and Proper Names. Australian National University Press. ISBN 978-0-708-10741-6. Archived from the original on 24 July 2008.
