= Kangjei =

Kangjei is a Meitei term, meaning to hit (jei, derived from chei) a round object (kang). It may also refer to:

- Polo
- Sagol kangjei, a Meitei form of polo, also interpreted as "horseback hockey"
- Khong kangjei, a Meitei form of field hockey indigenous to Manipur
- Kangjei (Khamba Thoibi), an event from the Khamba Thoibi classical epic
