= Polo =

Equestrian team sport

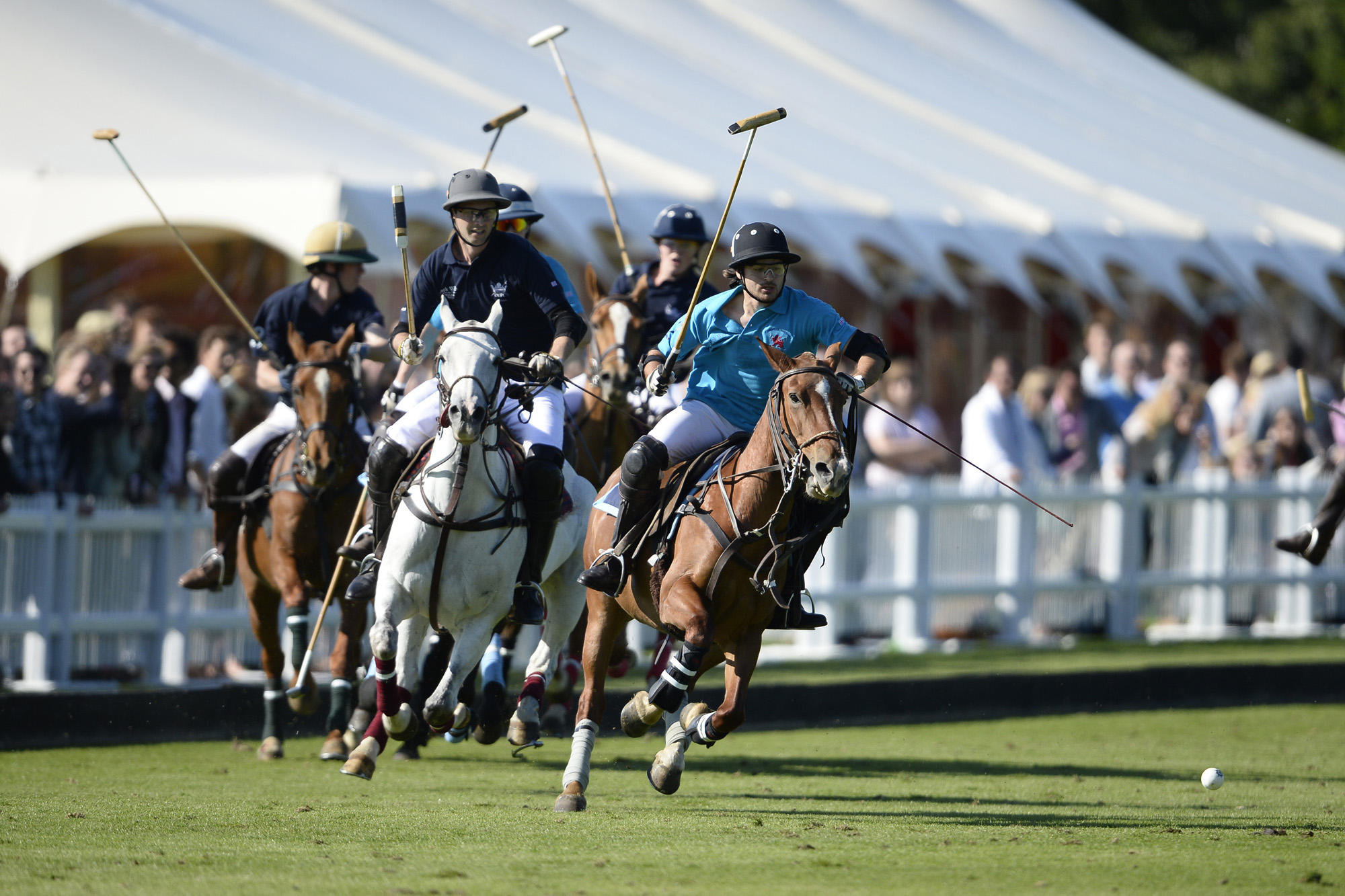
- Players playing polo
- Highest governing body: Federation of International Polo
- Nicknames: The Sport of Kings
- Origin: 6th C. BCE – 1st C. CE by Eurasian nomadic peoples of Central Asia; c. 1st C. BCE – 7th C. CE developed and formalised in Greater Iran by Persians of the Parthian and Sasanian Empires; having its modern form and rules developed in India.
- Clubs: 90+

Characteristics
- Contact: Yes
- Team members: Field polo: 4; Arena: 3
- Mixed-sex: Yes
- Type: Equestrian, ball game, team sport
- Equipment: Polo pony, mallet, ball, protective wear
- Venue: Polo field or arena

Presence
- Country or region: Worldwide
- Olympic: Formerly (1900, 1908, 1920–1924 and 1936)

Polo is an equestrian team sport played with a mallet and ball. It is one of the oldest known team sports in the world.

Outdoor or "field" polo is played on a 300-by-160-yard grass field, while indoor or "arena" polo is played on a smaller 300-by-150-foot dirt arena. Players score by using a wooden mallet to drive the ball between the opposing team's goal posts while riding at speeds of up to 35 miles per hour. The team scoring the most goals wins. A game of outdoor polo lasts about one and a half to two hours, has two teams of four players, and consists of four to eight seven-minute chukkas (or chukkers), between or during which players change mounts.

The precursor of polo and its variants was an equestrian game named chovgan (Persian: چوگان), which was played from the 6th century BCE to the 1st century CE in Persia (Iran) and Central Asia. Its modern form developed in India, and was later adopted by the Western world.

Often called "The Sport of Kings", polo has become popular around the world as a spectator sport for equestrians and high society. There are over 100 member countries in the Federation of International Polo. It was an Olympic sport from 1900 to 1936.

== History ==
=== Origins and etymology ===
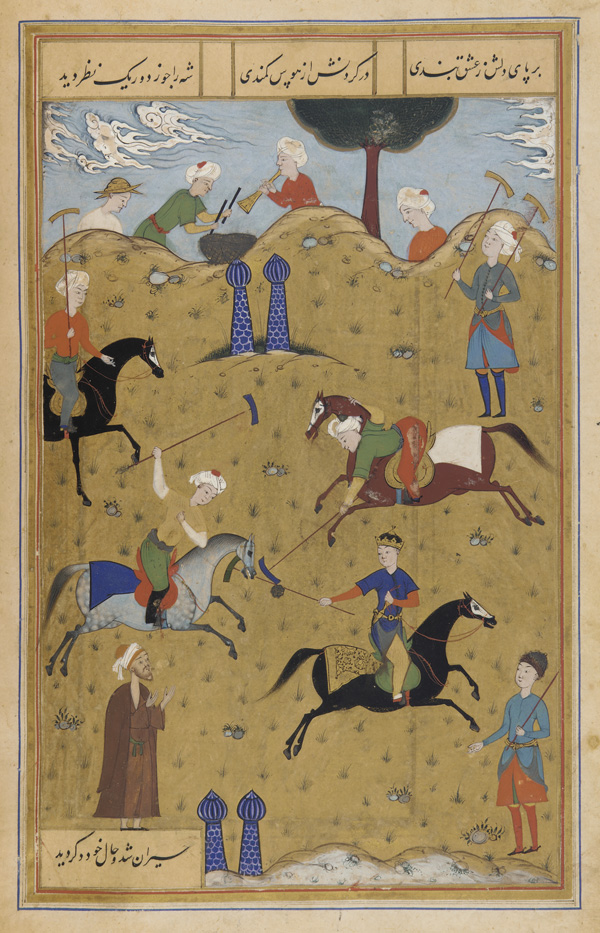
A Persian miniature from the poem Guy-o Chawgân ("the Ball and the Polo-mallet") during the Safavid dynasty of Persia, showing courtiers on horseback playing polo, 1546 CE

The English name of the game derives from the Balti-language (Note: Balti is a Tibetic language spoken by the Balti people in Pakistani-administered Gilgit-Baltistan and in Indian-administered Ladakh.) word for 'ball', polo. It is cognate with the Standard Tibetan pulu, also meaning 'ball'.

The game originated as chovgan in the greater Iran region. Many scholars suggest that polo most likely began as a simple game played by the Iranian peoples. An archaic variation of polo, regionally referred to as buzkashi or kokpar, is still played in parts of Central Asia. Both men and women took part. During the period of the Parthian Empire (247 BCE to 224 CE), the sport was patronised by kings and noblemen. According to The Oxford Dictionary of Late Antiquity, the Persian ball game was an important pastime in the court of the Sasanian Empire (224–651 CE). It was also part of the royal education for the Sasanian ruling class. Emperor Shapur II learnt to play polo at age seven in 316 CE.

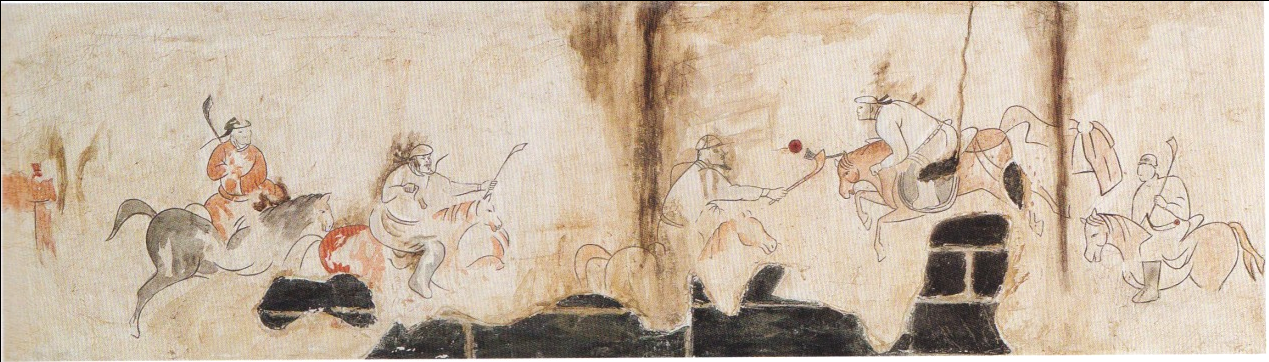
In China, Liao dynasty era

=== Middle Ages and Early Modern era ===
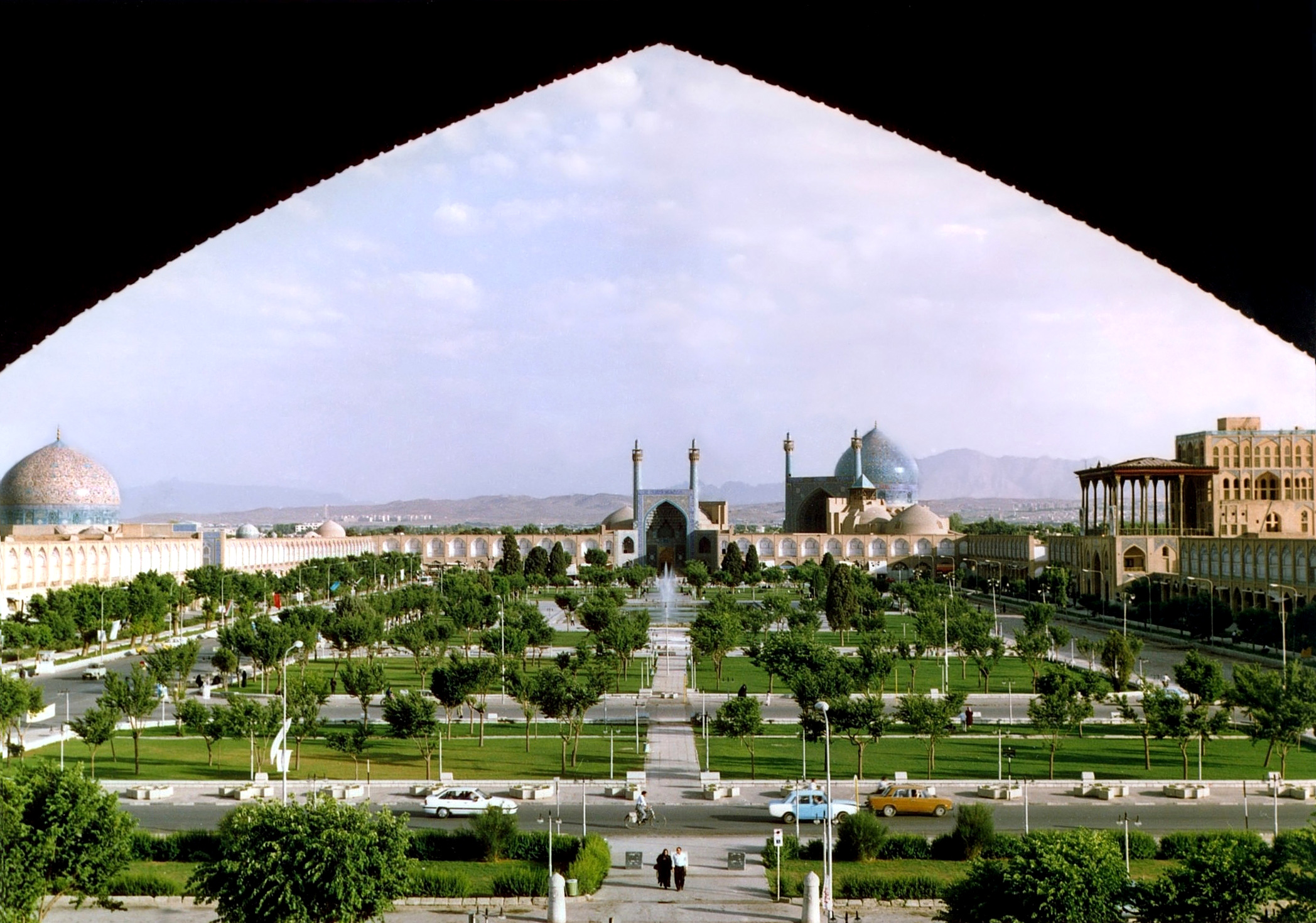
Naqsh-e Jahan Square in Isfahan, Iran, is the site of a medieval royal polo field

Abbasid Baghdad had a large polo ground outside its walls, and one of the city's early 13th-century gates, the Bab al Halba, was named after these nearby polo grounds. The game continued to be supported by Mongol rulers of Persia in the 13th century, as well as under the Safavid dynasty. In the 17th century, Naqsh-i Jahan Square in Isfahan was built as a polo field by King Abbas I. The game was also learned by the neighboring Byzantine Empire at an early date. A tzykanisterion (stadium for playing tzykanion, the Byzantine name for polo) was built by Emperor Theodosius II (r. 408–450) inside the Great Palace of Constantinople. Emperor Basil I (r. 867–886) excelled at it; Emperor Alexander (r. 912–913) died from exhaustion while playing polo. John I of Trebizond (r. 1235–1238) died from a fatal injury during a game.

After the Early Muslim conquests by the Ayyubid and Mamluk dynasties of Egypt and the Levant, their elites favoured it above all other sports. Sultans such as Saladin and Baybars were known to play it and encourage it in their courts. Saladin was known for being a skilled polo player, which contributed to his cavalry training. Polo sticks were featured as one of the suits on the Mamluk precursor to modern-day playing cards. Europeans transformed the polo stick suit into the "clubs" of the "Latin" decks, as polo was little known to them at that time.

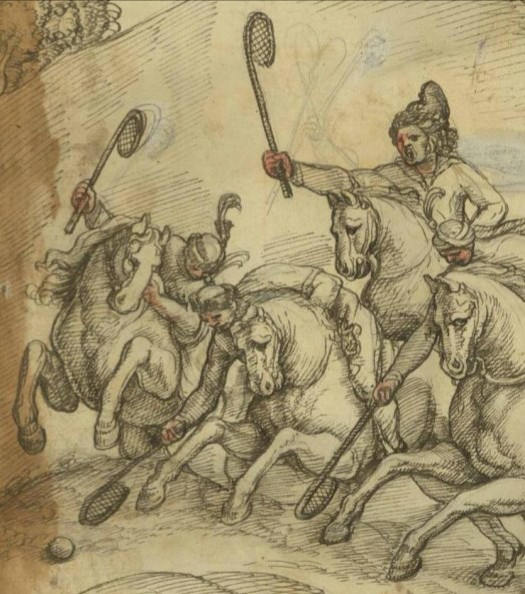
Georgians playing Tskhenburti, a Polo-like game, in the Kingdom of Imereti, Painting by Italian missionary Teramo Castelli, 1640.

The game spread to South Asia where it has had a presence in the northwestern areas of present-day Pakistan (including Gilgit, Chitral, Hunza, and Baltistan) since at least the 15th to the 16th centuries. Qutubuddin Aibak (r. 1206–1210), originally a Turkic slave who later founded the Mamluk dynasty (1206–1290) Delhi Sultanate, was accidentally killed during a game of polo when his horse fell and he was impaled on the pommel of his saddle.

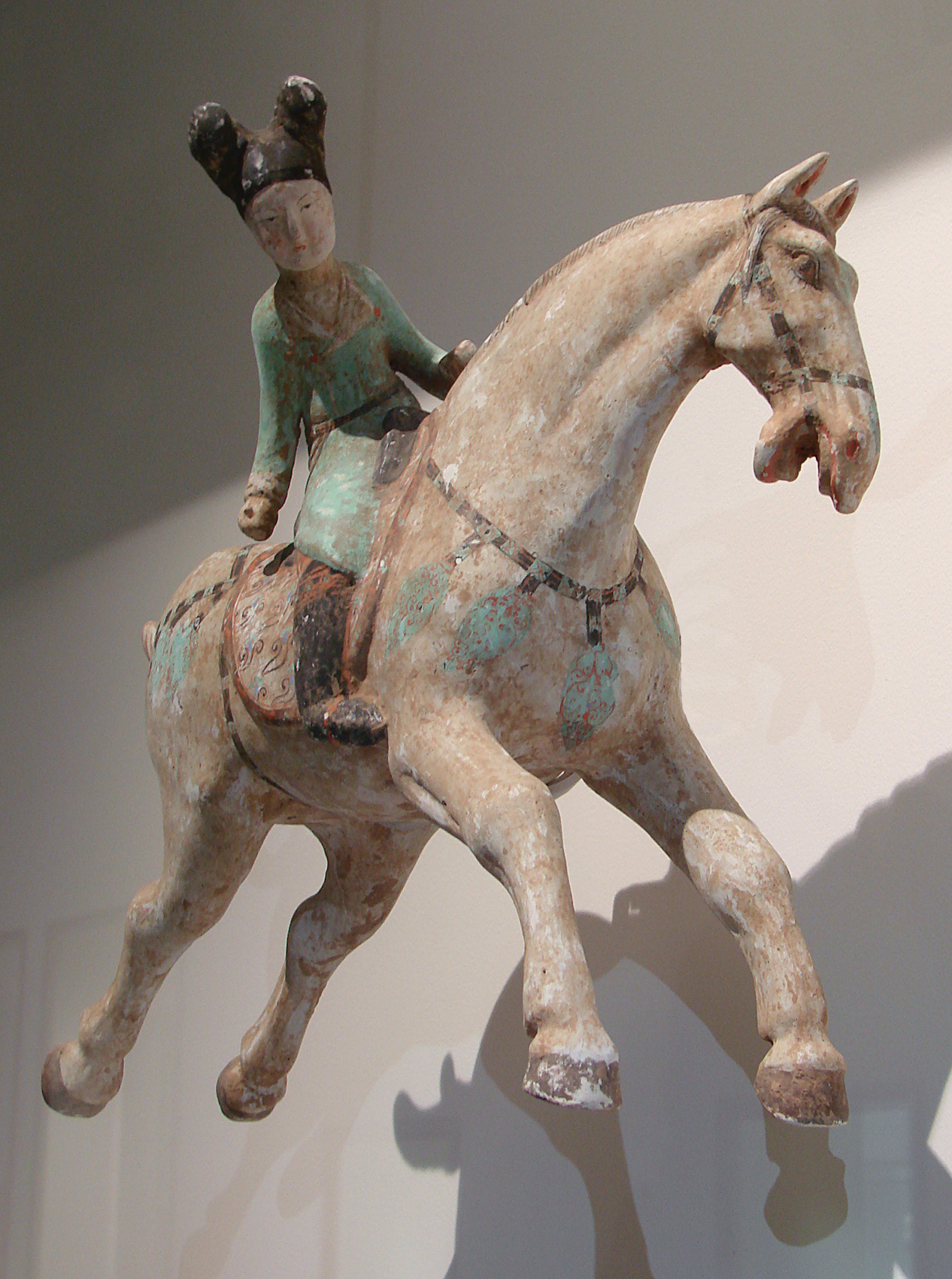
Glazed earthenware figurine from the Tang-dynasty of a female polo player on a "flying horse", Guimet Museum

Polo likely travelled via the Silk Road to China, where it was popular in the Tang dynasty capital of Chang'an, where it was played by women, who had to wear a male dress to do so; many Tang dynasty tomb figures of female players survive. According to The Oxford Dictionary of Late Antiquity, the popularity of polo in Tang China was "bolstered, no doubt, by the presence of the Sasanian court in exile". A "polo-obsessed" noblewoman was buried with her donkeys on 6 October 878 in Xi’an, China.

=== Modern era ===
==== India and Britain ====
In Manipur, the game's Tibetic names, polo or pulu, were in use, referring to the wooden ball. These terms were anglicised when the sport spread to the west. A European polo club was established in the town of Silchar in Assam, India in 1859, by English tea planters having learnt it from Manipuri incomers.

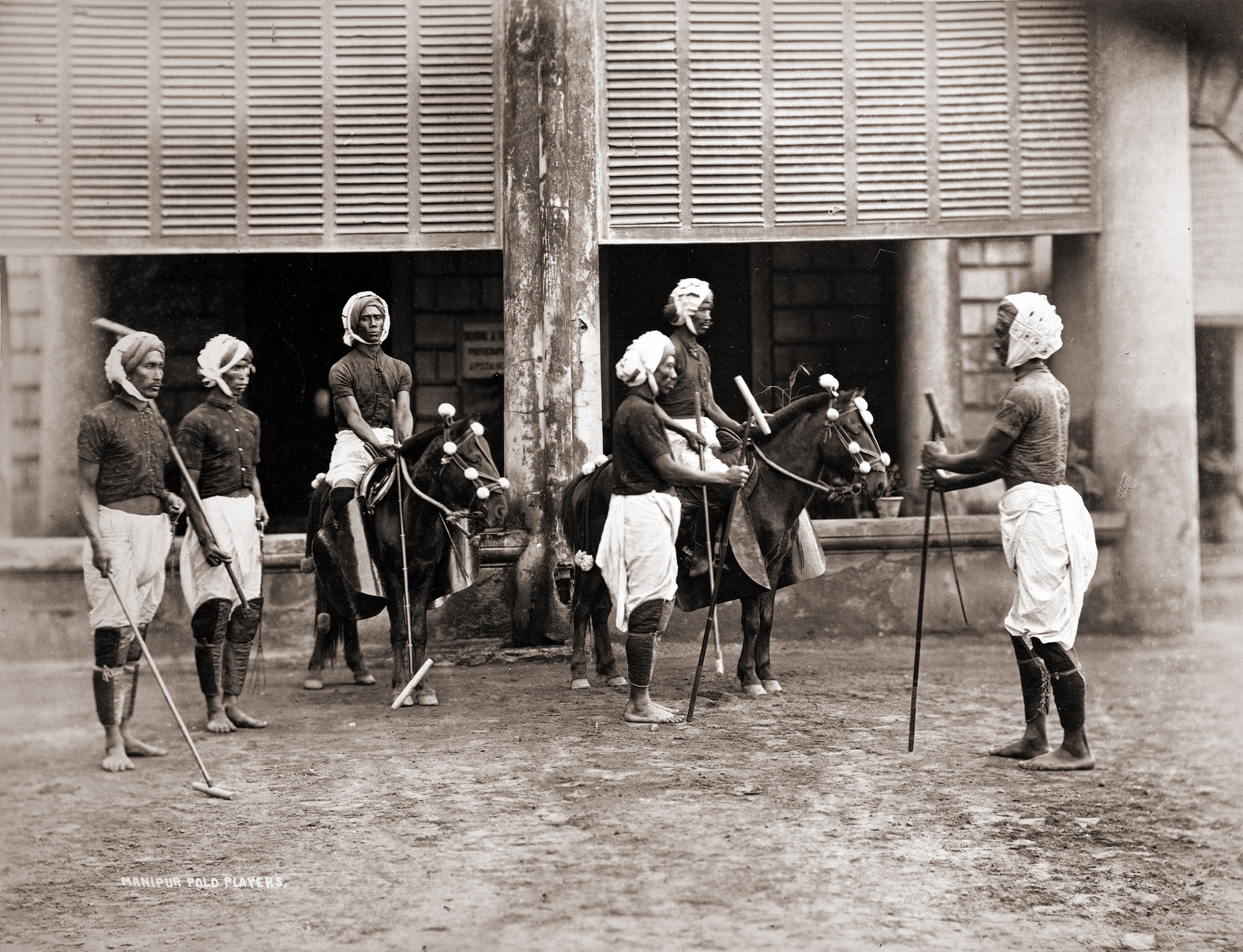
Manipuri polo players in 1875

Sagol kangjei was one of three forms of hockey in Manipur, the other ones being field hockey (called khong kangjei) and wrestling-hockey (called mukna kangjei). Local rituals such as those connected to the Ibudhou Marjing, the winged-pony god of polo and the creation-ritual episodes of the Lai Haraoba festival enacting the life of his son, Khoriphaba, the polo-playing god of sports. Later, according to Cheitharol Kumbaba, a royal chronicle of King Kangba, who ruled Manipur much earlier than Nongda Lairen Pakhangba (33 CE) introduced sagol kangjei ('kangjei on horseback'). Further regular playing of this game commenced in 1605, during the reign of King Khagemba under newly framed rules of the game.

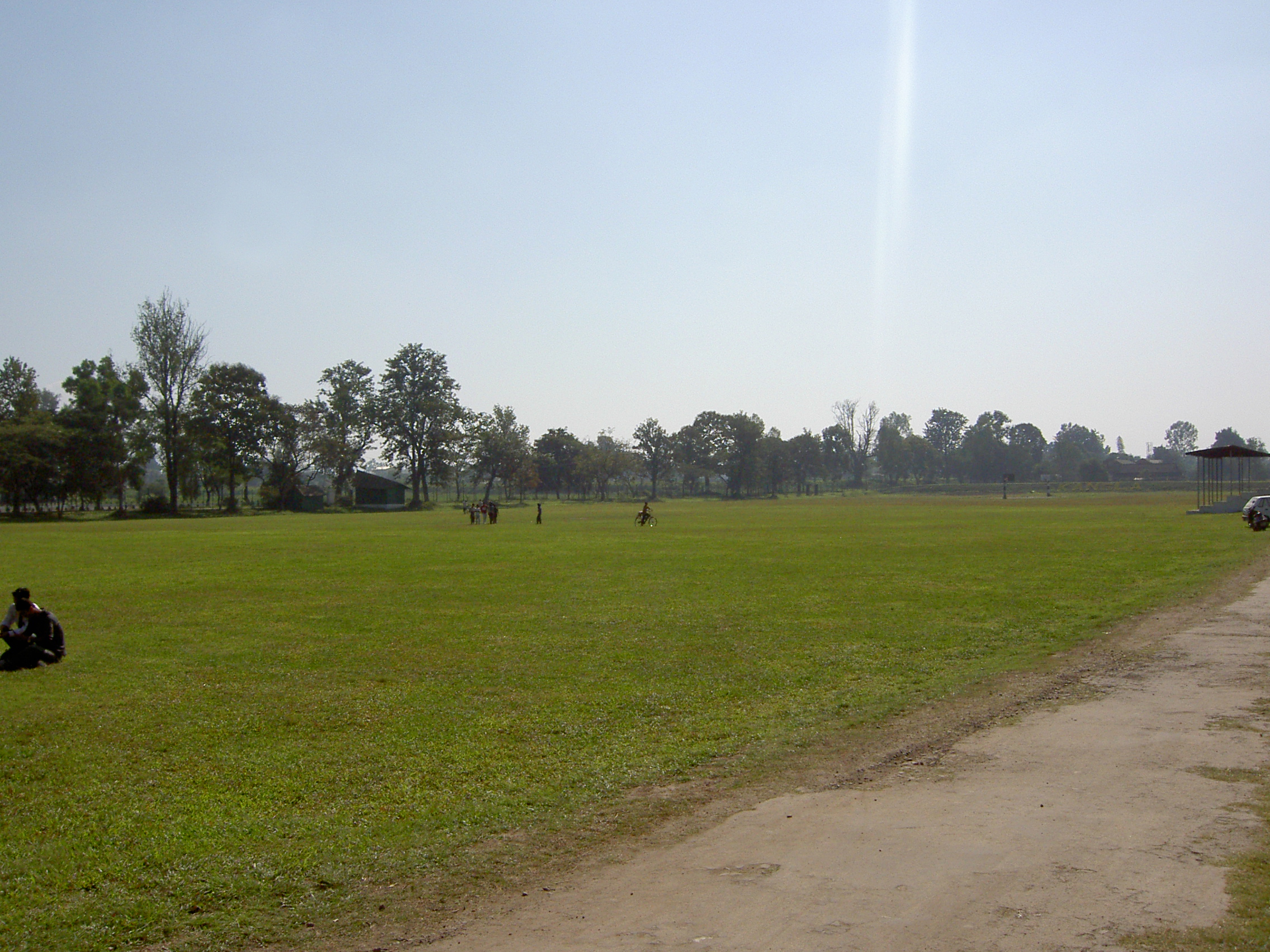
Old polo field in Imphal, Manipur

In Manipur, polo was and is still played with seven players to a side. The players are mounted on the indigenous Manipuri Pony, which stands less than 13 hands (52 inches, 132 cm). There are no goal posts, and a player scores simply by hitting the ball out of either end of the field. Players strike the ball with the long side of the mallet head, not the end. Players are not permitted to carry the ball, although blocking the ball with any part of the body except the open hand is permitted. The sticks are made of cane, and the balls are made from the roots of bamboo. Players protected their legs by attaching leather shields to their saddles and girths.

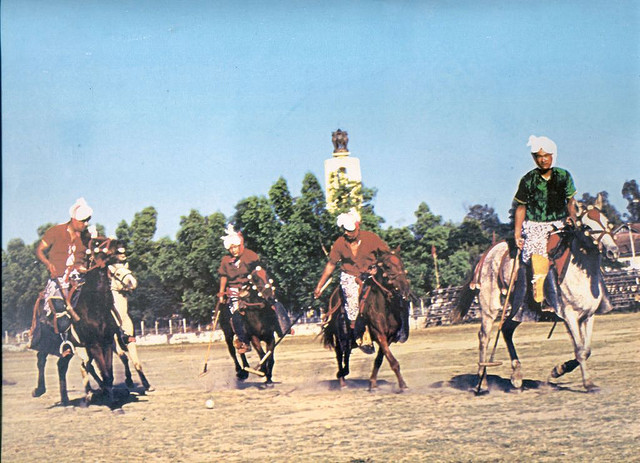
Polo players of Manipur in Mapal Kangjeibung, the world's oldest polo playground

In Manipur, the game was played even by commoners who owned a pony. The kings of Manipur had a royal polo ground within the ramparts of their Kangla Fort. Here they played on the manung kangjei bung (lit. 'inner polo ground'). Public games were held, as they still are today, at the mapan kangjei bung (lit. 'outer polo ground'), a polo ground just outside the Kangla. Weekly games called hapta kangjei (lit. 'weekly polo') were also played in a polo ground outside the current palace.

The oldest polo ground in the world is the Imphal Polo Ground in Manipur. The history of this polo ground is contained in the royal chronicle Cheitharol Kumbaba starting from 33 CE. Lieutenant (later Major General) Joseph Ford Sherer, the father of modern polo, visited the state and played on this polo ground in the 1850s. Lord Curzon, the Viceroy of India visited the state in 1901 and measured the polo ground as "225 yards long and 110 yards wide" (206 m × 101 m).

The Cachar Club, established in 1859, is located on Club Road in Silchar city in Assam. In 1862, the oldest polo club still in existence, Calcutta Polo Club, was established by two British soldiers, Major General Joseph Sherer and Captain Robert Stewart. Later they spread the game to their peers in England. Polo was first played in England by the 10th Hussars in 1869. The British are credited with spreading polo worldwide in the late 19th century and the early 20th century at the height of their empire. The establishment of polo clubs throughout England and western Europe followed after the formal codification of rules. The 10th Hussars at Aldershot, Hants, introduced polo to England in 1834. The game's governing body in the United Kingdom is the Hurlingham Polo Association, which drew up the first set of formal British rules in 1874, many of which are still in existence.

This version of polo played in the 19th century was different from the faster form that was played in Manipur. The game was slow and methodical, with little passing between players and few set plays that required specific movements by participants without the ball. Neither players nor horses were trained to play a fast, non-stop game. This form of polo lacked the aggressive methods and required fewer equestrian skills. From the 1800s to the 1910s, a host of teams representing Indian principalities dominated the international polo scene. The game had reached Samoa by the 1890s.

==== Ireland ====
Polo Ireland arrived in Ireland in 1870 with the first official game played on Gormanstown Strand, County Meath. Three years later, the All Ireland Polo Club was founded by Horace Rochford in the Phoenix Park.

==== Argentina ====
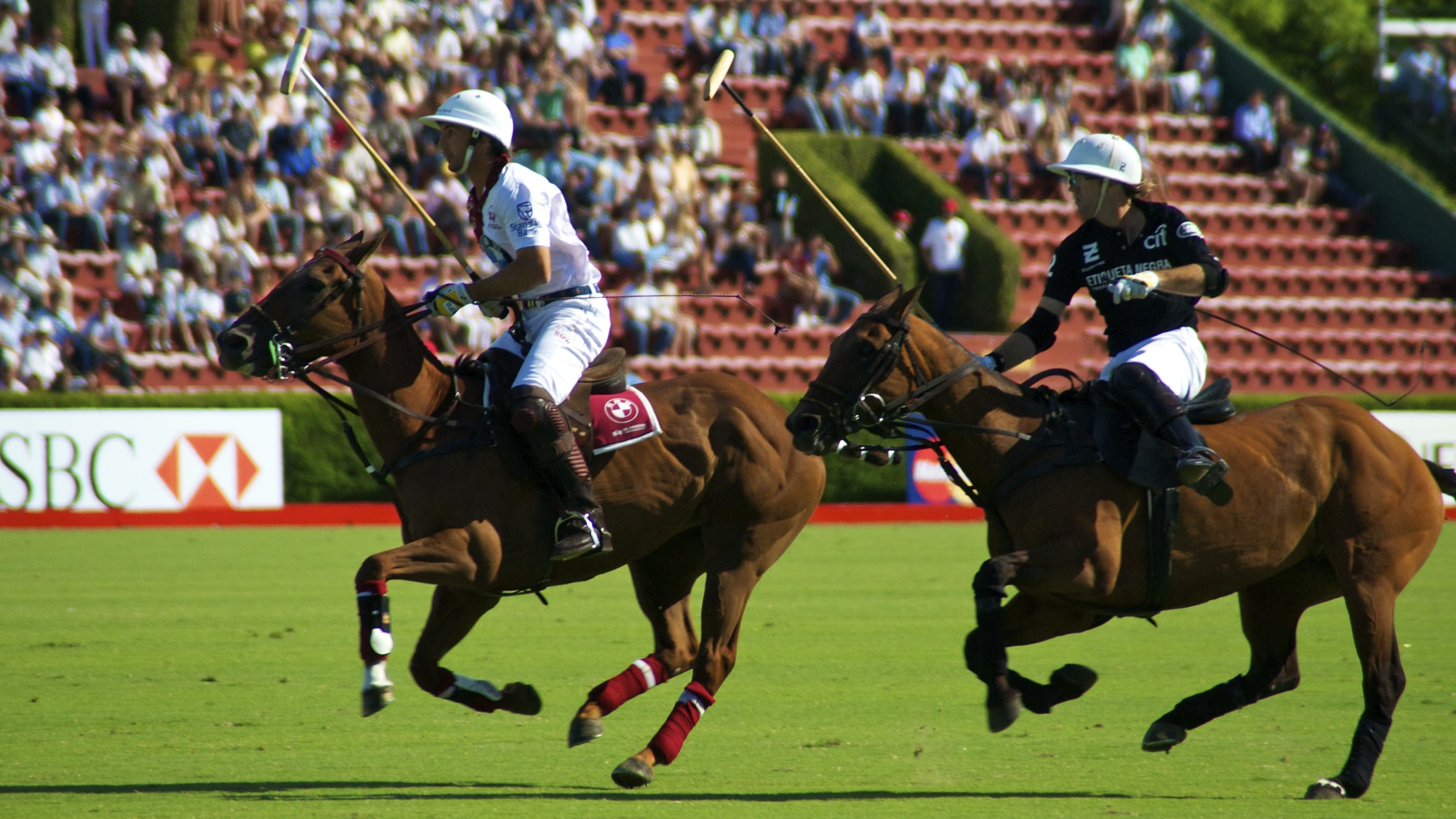
Argentine Polo Open Championship

Irish, Scottish, Welsh, and English immigrants in the Argentine pampas started practising polo. Among them, David Shennan is credited with having organised the first formal polo game of the country in 1875, at Estancia El Negrete, located in Buenos Aires Province.

The sport spread quickly among gauchos, and several clubs opened in the following years in the towns of Venado Tuerto, Cañada de Gómez, Quilmes, Flores and later (1888) Hurlingham. In 1892, the River Plate Polo Association was founded and constituted the basis for the current Asociación Argentina de Polo. In the Olympic Games held in Paris in 1924 a team composed of Juan Miles, Enrique Padilla, Juan Nelson, Arturo Kenny, G. Brooke Naylor, and A. Peña achieved the first gold medal in the nation's Olympic history. The title was defended at the 1936 Berlin Games with players Manuel Andrada, Andrés Gazzotti, Roberto Cavanagh, Luis Duggan, Juan Nelson, Diego Cavanagh, and Enrique Alberdi.

==== United States ====
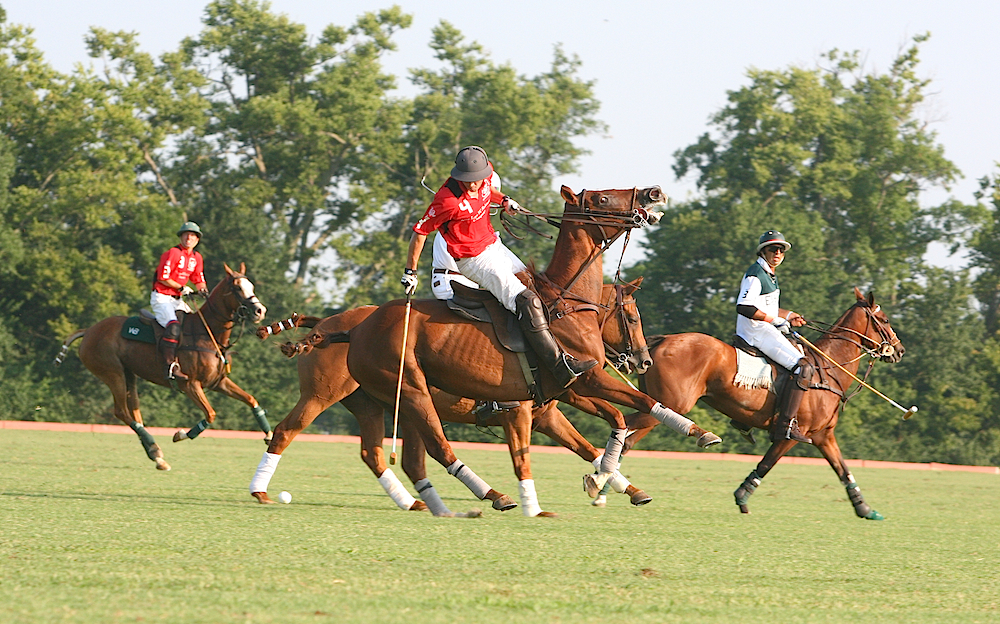
A polo match at the Kentucky Horse Park

James Gordon Bennett Jr. on 16 May 1876 organized what was billed as the first polo match in the United States at Dickel's Riding Academy at 39th Street and Fifth Avenue in New York City. The historical record states that James Gordon Bennett Jr. established the Westchester Polo Club on 6 May 1876, and on 13 May 1876, the Jerome Park Racetrack in Westchester County, New York (now Bronx County) was the site of the "first" American outdoor polo match.

H. L. Herbert, James Gordon Bennett, and August Belmont Jr. financed the original New York Polo Grounds. Herbert stated in a 1913 article that they formed the Westchester Club after the "first" outdoor game was played on 13 May 1876. This contradicts the historical record of the club being established before the Jerome Park game.

The Galveston News reported on 2 May 1876 that Denison, Texas had a polo club which was before James Gordon Bennett established his Westchester Club or attempted to play the "first" game. The Denison team sent a letter to James Gordon Bennett challenging him to a match. The challenge was published on 2 June 1876, in The Galveston Daily News. By the time the article came out on 2 June, the Denison Club had already received a letter from Bennett indicating the challenge was offered before the "first" games in New York.

There is an urban legend that the first game of polo in America was played in Boerne, Texas, at retired British officer Captain Glynn Turquand's famous Balcones Ranch. The legend also has plenty of evidence pointing to the fact that polo was played in Boerne before James Gordon Bennett Jr. ever picked up a polo mallet.

During the early part of the 20th century, under the leadership of Harry Payne Whitney, polo in the United States changed to become a high-speed sport, differing from the game in England, where it involved short passes to move the ball towards the opposition's goal. Whitney and his teammates used the fast break, sending long passes downfield to riders who had broken away from the pack at a full gallop. In 1909, a United States team defeated an English team.

In the late 1950s, champion polo player and Director of the Long Island Polo Association, Walter Scanlon, introduced the "short form", or "European" style, four-period match to the game of polo.

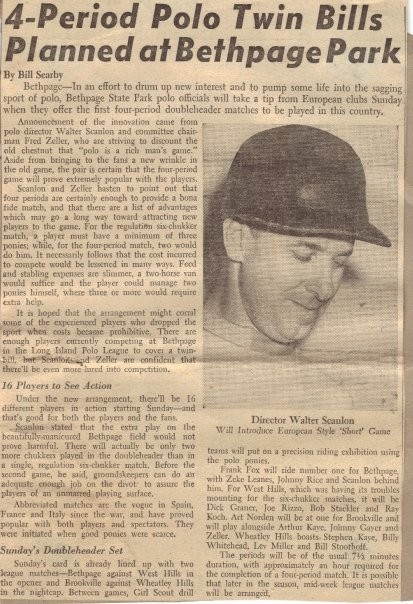
Director Walter Scanlon, Bethpage, Long Island

== Contemporary polo ==
Polo is played professionally in many countries, such as Argentina, Australia, Brazil, Canada, Chile, Dominican Republic, France, Germany, Iran, India, New Zealand, Mexico, Pakistan, Jamaica, Spain, South Africa, Switzerland, the United Kingdom, and the United States, and is now an active sport in 77 countries. Although its tenure as an Olympic sport was limited to 1900–1939, in 1998 the International Olympic Committee recognised it as a sport with an international governing body, the Federation of International Polo. The World Polo Championship is held every three years by the Federation.

=== Argentina ===
Argentina has the largest contingent of 10 handicap players out of any other country. Five teams were able to gather four 10 handicap players each, to make 40 handicap teams: Coronel Suárez, 1975, 1977–1979 (Alberto Heguy, Juan Carlos Harriott Jr., Alfredo Harriot and Horacio Heguy); La Espadaña, 1989–1990 (Carlos Gracida, Gonzalo Pieres, Alfonso Pieres and Ernesto Trotz Jr.); Indios Chapaleufú, 1992–1993 (Bautista Heguy, Gonzalo Heguy, Horacio Heguy Jr. and Marcos Heguy); La Dolfina, 2009–2010 (Adolfo Cambiaso Jr., Lucas Monteverde, Mariano Aguerre and Bartolomé Castagnola); Ellerstina, 2009 (Facundo Pieres, Gonzalo Pieres Jr., Pablo Mac Donough and Juan Martín Nero).

The three major polo tournaments in Argentina, known as "Triple Corona" ("Triple Crown"), are Campeonato Abierto de Hurlingham, Tortugas Polo Open, and Palermo Polo Open. Polo season usually lasts from October to December.

=== East and Southeast Asia ===
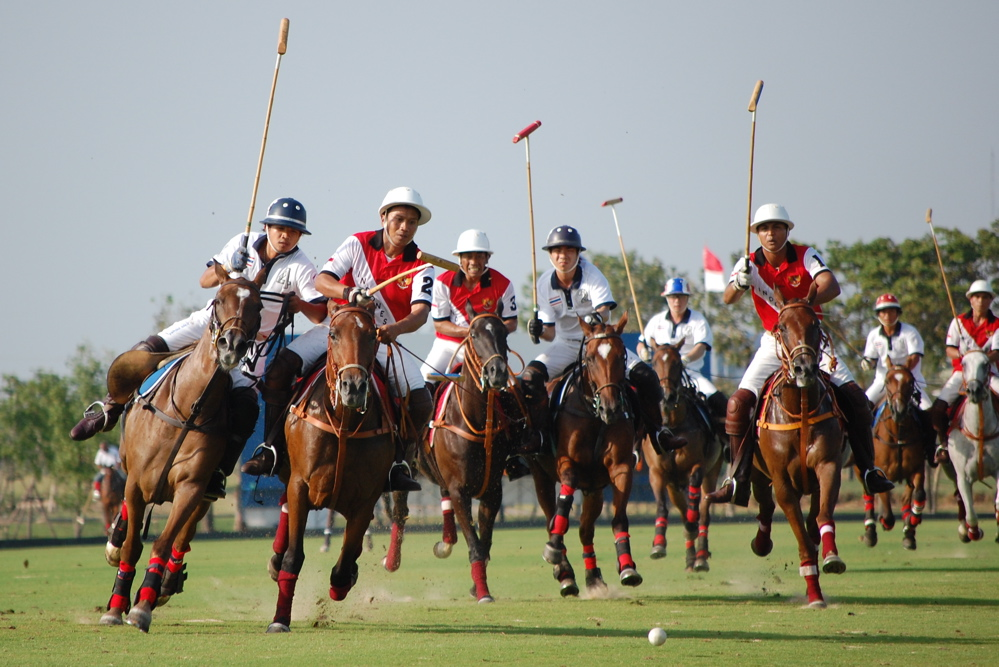
Indonesia plays against Thailand in SEA Games Polo 2007

Polo has been played in Malaysia and Singapore, both of which are former British colonies, since being introduced to British Malaya during the late 19th century. Royal Johor Polo Club was formed in 1884, and Singapore Polo Club was formed in 1886. The oldest polo club in the modern country of Malaysia is Selangor Polo Club, founded in 1902. It was largely played by royalty and the political and business elite.

Polo was played at the 2007 Southeast Asian Games, 2017 Southeast Asian Games, and 2019 Southeast Asian Games.

A Chinese Equestrian Association has been formed with two new clubs in China: the Beijing Sunny Time Polo Club, founded by Xia Yang in 2004, and the Nine Dragons Hill Polo Club in Shanghai, founded in 2005.

=== West Asia ===
There are five active clubs in Iran, six active polo clubs in the UAE, one club in Bahrain and The Royal Jordanian Polo Club in Amman, Jordan.

=== India ===
The world's oldest polo club is the Calcutta Polo Club in Kolkata, founded in the 19th century. It hosts the Ezra Cup, the oldest polo tournament.

The governing body of polo in India is the Indian Polo Association. The World Champions Polo League was launched in Jaipur in 2016. It is a new version of polo, similar to the Twenty20 format of cricket. The pitch was made smaller and accommodated a large audience. The first event of the World Champions Polo League took place in Bhavnagar, Gujarat, with six teams and room for 10,000 spectators. The rules were changed and the duration of matches made shorter.

=== Ireland ===
There are seven clubs in the Ireland. The sport has been made more accessible by the creation of training programmes, such as the beginner to pro programme at Polo Wicklow.

=== Pakistan ===
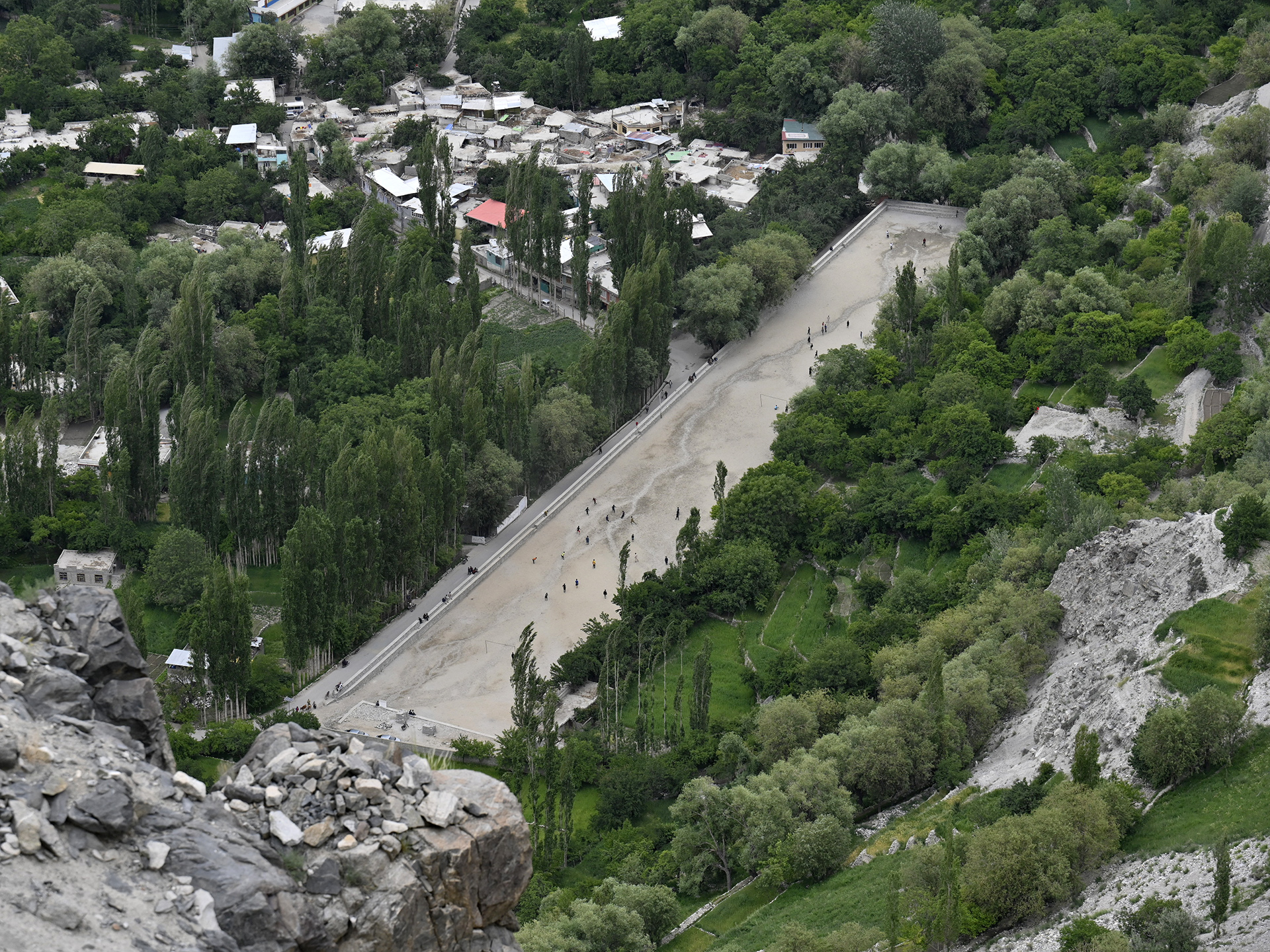
View of the Shabshi (Yabgo) Polo Ground in Khaplu Valley, as seen from Thoksikhar Mosque, Gilgit-Baltistan, Pakistan

The annual Shandur Polo Festival at Shandur Top in Chitral District is an international event. The Shandur polo ground at Shandur Pass is the world's highest, at approximately 3,734 metres (12,251 ft). The governing body of polo in Pakistan is the Pakistan Polo Association. There are more than twenty-one polo clubs in Pakistan and over forty polo championships are held each year. Pakistan has qualified for the preliminary rounds of the World Polo Championship three times. Pakistan's Hissam Ali Haider is the highest-capped player in the Asian circuit. He has played for Cartier in the St. Moritz Snow Polo World Cup and the Commonwealth team in the Royal Salute Coronation Cup, both of which were won by his team.

=== United Kingdom ===
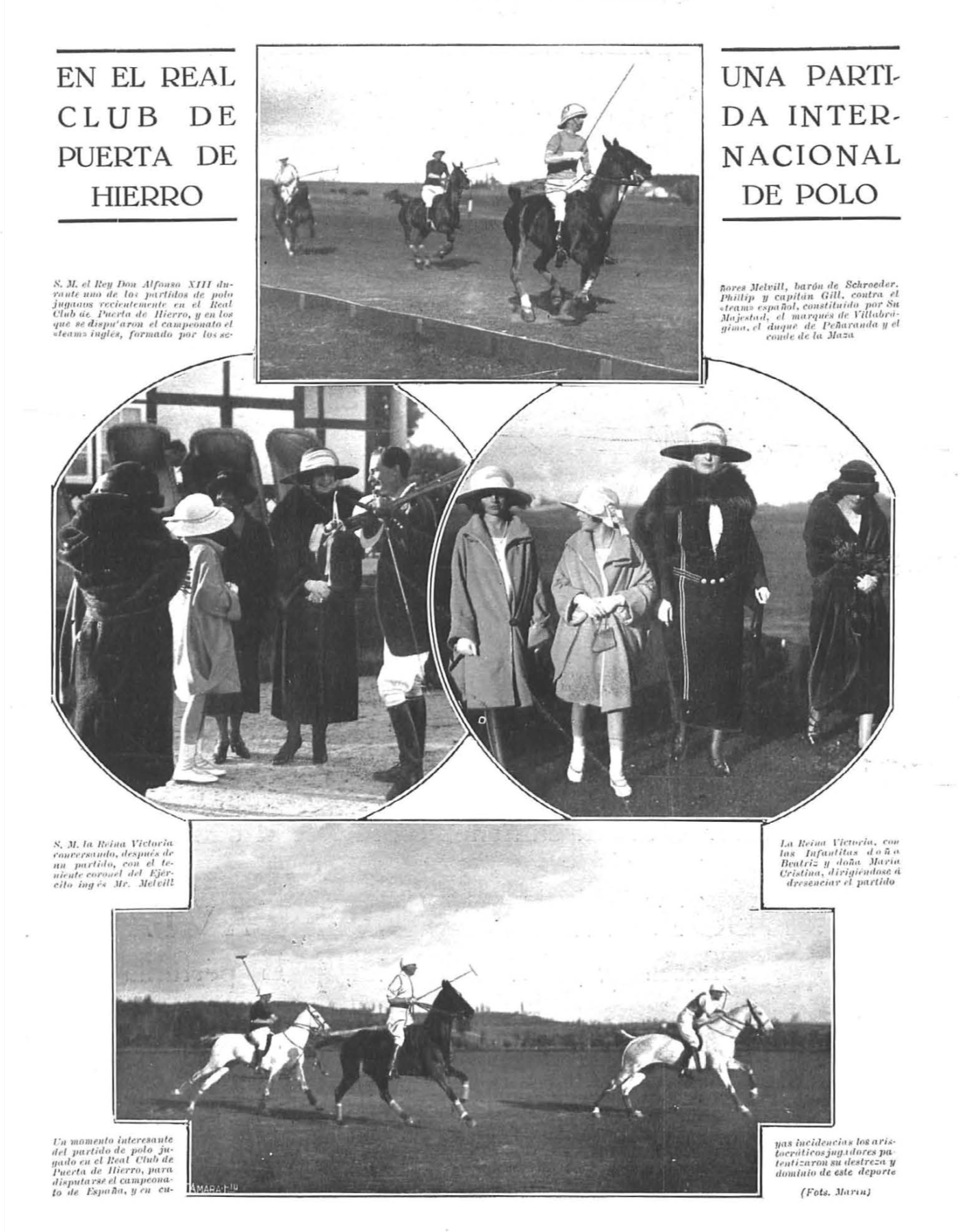
Polo match between the United Kingdom and Spain at Club Puerta de Hierro, 1922. The English side was represented by Frederick A. Gill and Teignmouth P. Melvill whilst the Spanish were represented by Alfonso XIII and the Duke of Peñaranda amongst others.

The governing body in the United Kingdom is the Hurlingham Polo Association, dating from 1875, which amalgamated with the County Polo Association in 1949. The UK Armed Forces Polo Association oversees the sport in the three armed services.

=== United States ===
The United States Polo Association (USPA) is the governing body for polo in the U.S. The U.S. is the only country that has separate women's polo, run by the United States Women's Polo Federation.

=== Rest of the Americas ===
Polo is played in Brazil, Chile and Mexico.

== Rules ==
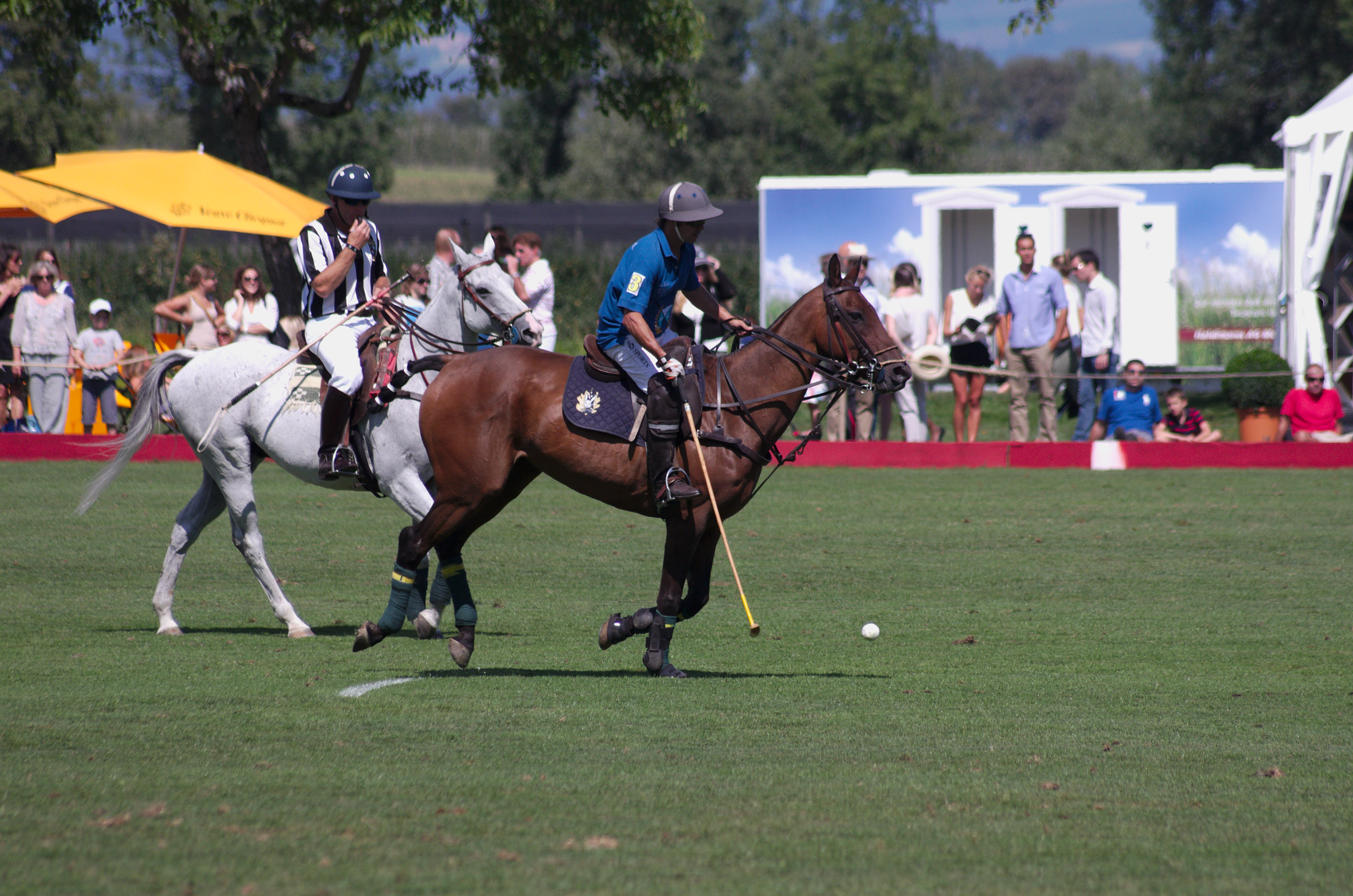
Polo player, with referee

The rules of polo are written to include the safety of both players and horses. Games are monitored by umpires. A whistle is blown when an infraction occurs, and penalties are awarded. Strategic plays in polo are based on the "line of the ball", an imaginary line that extends through the ball in the line of travel. This line traces the ball's path and extends past the ball along that trajectory. The line of the ball defines rules for players to approach the ball safely. The "line of the ball" changes each time the ball changes direction. The player who hits the ball generally has the right of way, and other players cannot cross the line of the ball in front of that player. As players approach the ball, they ride on either side of the line of the ball giving each access to the ball. A player can cross the line of the ball when it does not create a dangerous situation. Most infractions and penalties are related to players improperly crossing the line of the ball or the right of way. When a player has the line of the ball on their right, or "off-side," they have the right of way. A "ride-off" is when a player moves another player off the line of the ball by making shoulder-to-shoulder contact with the other players' horses. This is called "bumping". In order for a player to bump another player without committing an "uneven ride-off" foul, the two horses must be shoulder-to-shoulder and moving at the same speed.

=== Legal contact: ride-offs and hooks ===
Two forms of physical contact are explicitly permitted under both HPA and USPA rules.

A ride-off consists of a player using shoulder-to-shoulder contact at roughly equal speed to push an opponent off the line of the ball. It is the defining form of contact in polo. A hook is the use of one's mallet to block or deflect an opponent's swing; it is only legal when executed on the same side as the opponent's swing or directly behind them, and never above the height of the opponent's shoulder. Sandwiching an opponent between two players, and any contact at a dangerous angle to horse or rider, is prohibited.

=== Penalties ===
Fouls are punished by a graduated system of free hits, numbered 1 to 7 by severity:

Penalty	Severity	What happens
1	Most severe	Automatic goal awarded; no shot taken
2	Very severe	Undefended free hit from 30 yards from the centre of the goal
3	Severe	Undefended free hit from 40 yards
4	Moderate–severe	Defended free hit from 60 yards; opponents must remain at least 30 yards away
5a	Moderate	Free hit from the spot of the foul; opponents 30 yards away
5b	Moderate	Free hit from the centre of the field
6 (Safety)	Minor	Awarded when a defending player hits the ball over their own back line; free hit taken opposite that point
7	Procedural	Retake awarded when a Penalty 2–6 was not executed correctly

The defending player has a variety of opportunities for their team to gain possession of the ball. They can push the opponent off the line or steal the ball from the opponent. Another common defensive play is called "hooking." While a player is taking a swing at the ball, their opponent can block the swing by using their mallet to hook the mallet of the player swinging at the ball. A player may hook only if they are on the side where the swing is being made or directly behind an opponent. A player may not purposely touch another player, another player's tack, or a pony with their mallet. Unsafe hooking is a foul that will result in a penalty shot being awarded. For example, it is a foul for a player to reach over an opponent's mount in an attempt to hook.

The other basic defensive play is called the bump or ride-off. It's similar to a body check in ice hockey. In a ride-off, a player rides their pony alongside an opponent's mount to move an opponent away from the ball or to take them out of a play. It must be executed properly so that it does not endanger the horses or the players. The angle of contact must be safe and can not knock the horses off balance, or harm the horses in any way. Two players following the line of the ball and riding one another off have the right of way over a single man coming from any direction.

Fouls are potentially dangerous plays that infringe on the rules of the game. There are degrees of dangerous and unfair play and penalty shots are awarded based on the severity of the foul and where the foul was committed on the polo field. White lines on the polo field indicate where the mid-field, sixty, forty, and thirty yard penalties are taken.

The official set of rules and rules interpretations are reviewed and published annually by each country's polo association. Most of the smaller associations follow the rules of the Hurlingham Polo Association, the national governing body of the sport of polo in the United Kingdom, and the United States Polo Association.

=== Players ===
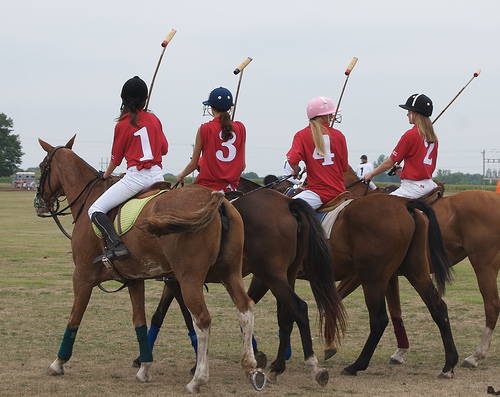
A women's polo team, United States

Outdoor polo is played by two teams of four mounted players. Teams can be all-male, all-female, or mixed. Each player on the team has a specific number and has a specific role on the team.

Polo must be played right-handed to prevent head-on collisions.

=== Ball ===
The modern outdoor polo ball is made of a high-impact plastic. Historically they have been made of bamboo, leather covered cork, hard rubber, and willow root. White painted leather covered cricket balls were once used in Great Britain.

The regulation outdoor polo ball is 3 inches (7.6 cm) to 3 1/2 inches (8.9 cm) in diameter and weighs 3 1/2 ounces (99 g) to 4 1/2 ounces (130 g).

Plastic balls were introduced in the 1970s. They are less prone to breakage and cheaper.

=== Equipment ===
The rules for equipment vary in details between the hosting authorities, but are always for the safety of the players and mounts.

Mandatory equipment includes a protective helmet with chinstrap worn at all times by all players and mounted grooms. They have a rigid exterior and interior protective padding and must be to a locally accepted safety standard, PAS015 (UK), NOCSAE (US). A face guard is commonly integral with the helmet.

Polo boots and knee guards are mandatory in the UK during official play, and boots are recommended for all play everywhere. The UK also recommends goggles, elbow pads and gum shields. A shirt or jersey is required that distinguishes the player's team, and is not black and white stripes like an umpire shirt.

White polo pants or trousers are worn during official play. Polo gloves are commonly worn to protect from working the reins and mallet.

No equipment that could harm horses (such as certain spurs or whips) is permitted.

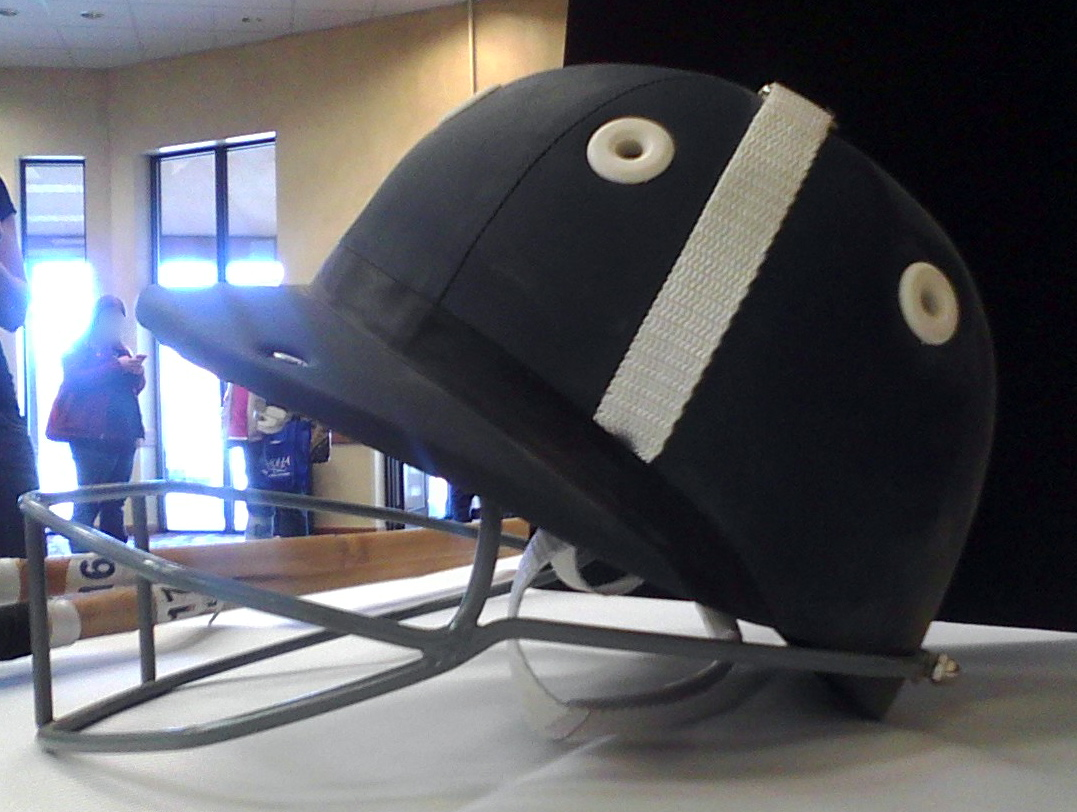
Polo helmet with face guard

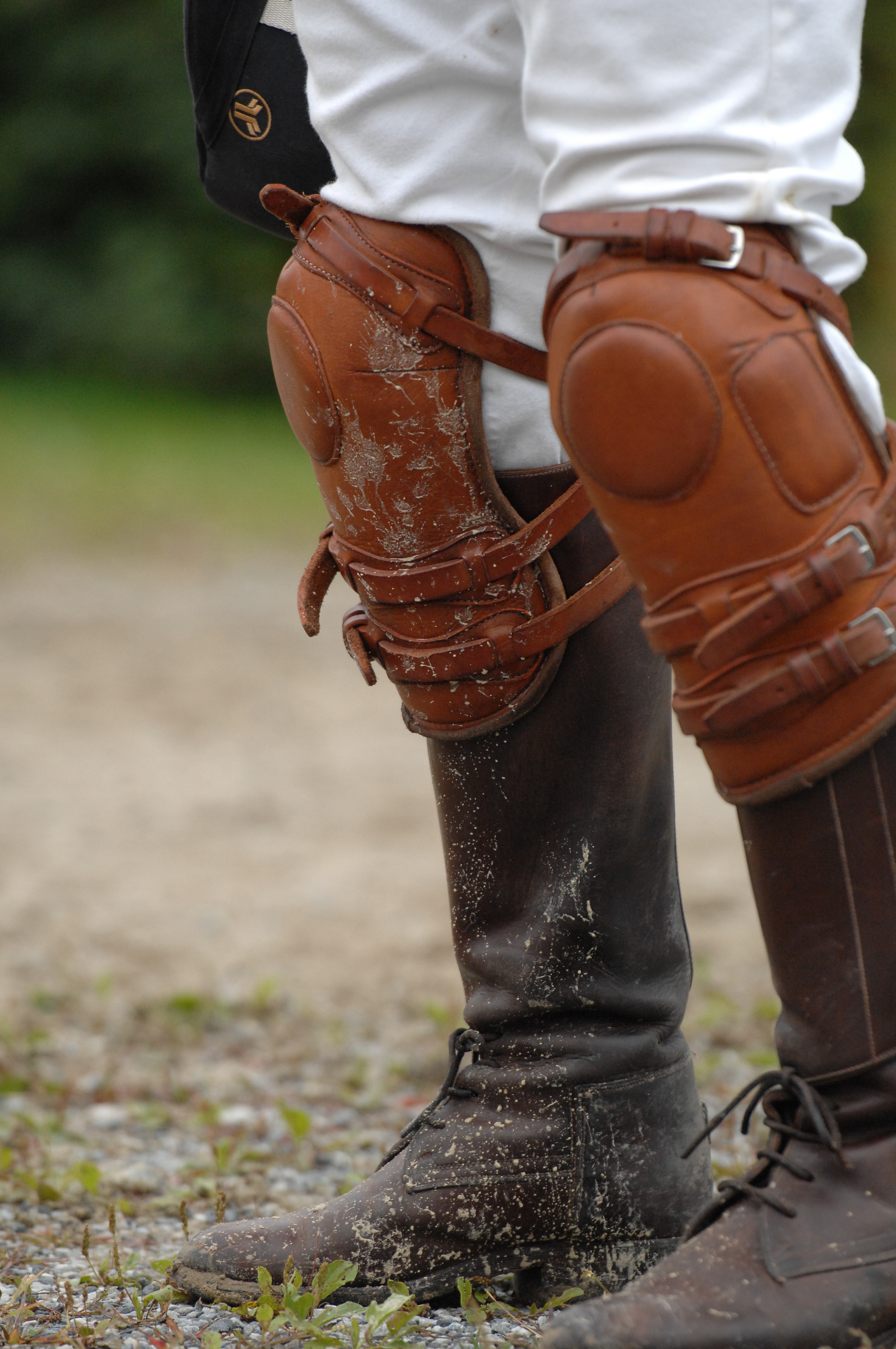
Polo knee pads, mandatory equipment

==== Mallet ====
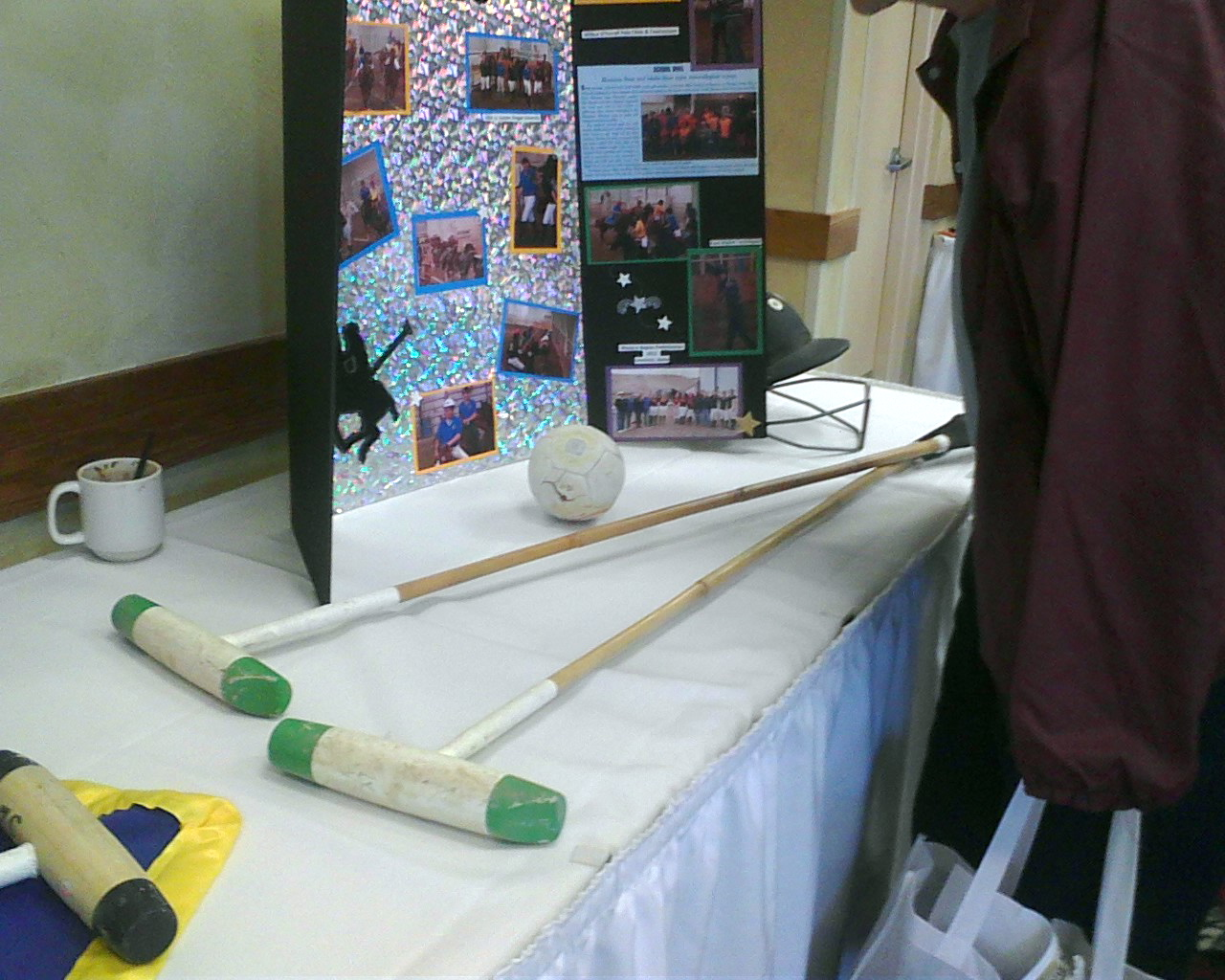
Polo mallets and ball

The polo mallet consists of a cane shaft with a rubber-wrapped grip, a webbed thong, called a sling, for wrapping around the thumb, and a wooden cigar-shaped head. The shaft is made of manau-cane (not bamboo, which is hollow), although a small number of mallets today are made from composite materials. Composite materials are usually not preferred by top players because the shaft of composite mallets cannot absorb vibrations as well as traditional cane mallets. The mallet head is generally made from a hardwood called tipa, approximately 9 1/4" inches long. The mallet head weighs from 160 g (5.6 oz) to 240 g (8.5 oz), depending on player preference and the type of wood used, and the shaft can vary in weight and flexibility depending on the player's preference. The weight of the mallet head is of important consideration for the more seasoned players. Female players can use lighter mallets than male players. For some polo players, the length of the mallet depends on the size of the horse: the taller the horse, the longer the mallet. However, some players prefer to use a single length of mallet regardless of the height of the horse. Variable lengths of the mallet typically range from 127 cm (50 in) to 134 cm (53 in). The term mallet is used exclusively in US English; British English prefers the term polo stick. The ball is struck with the broad sides of the mallet head rather than its round and flat tips.

=== The field ===
Relative sizes of an association football ground and a polo field

The playing field is 300 by 160 yards (274 by 146 m), the area of approximately six soccer fields or nine American football fields 10 acres (4.0 hectares), while arena polo is 315 by 151 feet (96 by 46 m). This is the largest playing field of any modern sport. The playing field is carefully maintained with closely mowed turf providing a safe, fast playing surface. Goals are posts which are set eight yards apart, centred at each end of the field. The surface of a polo field requires careful and constant grounds maintenance to keep the surface in good playing condition. During half-time of a match, spectators are invited to go onto the field to participate in a polo tradition called "divot stomping", which was developed not only to help replace the mounds of earth (divots) that are torn up by the horses' hooves, but also to afford spectators the opportunity to walk about and socialise.

=== Outdoor polo game structure ===
Outdoor or field polo lasts about one and a half to two hours and consists of four to eight seven-minute chukkas (or chukkers), between or during which players change mounts. At the end of each seven-minute chukka, play continues for an additional 30 seconds or until a stoppage in play, whichever comes first. There is a four-minute interval between chukkas and a ten-minute halftime. Play is continuous and is only stopped for rule infractions (fouls), broken tack (equipment) or injury to horse or player. The object is to score goals by hitting the ball between the goal posts, no matter how high in the air. If the ball goes wide of the goal, the defending team is allowed a free "knock-in" from the place where the ball crossed the goal line, thus getting ball back into play.

== Polo ponies ==
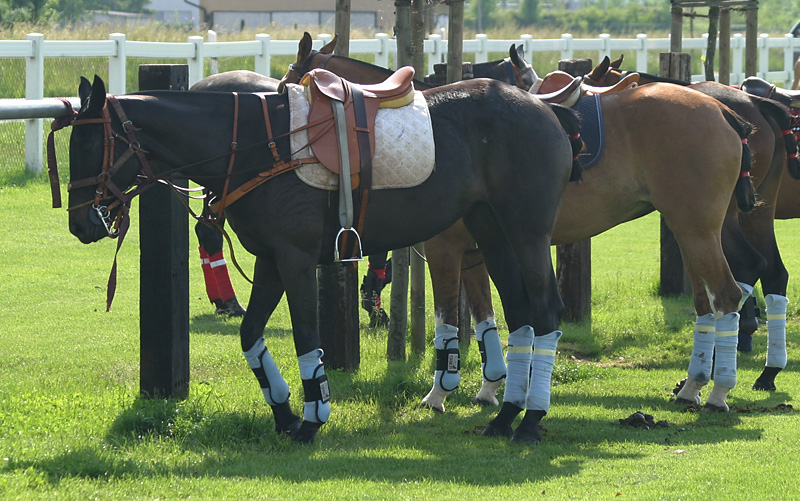
Polo ponies waiting for the game to begin

The mounts used are called 'polo ponies', although the term pony is purely traditional and the mount is actually a full-sized horse. They range from 14.2 to 16 hands (58 to 64 inches, 147 to 163 cm) high at the withers, and weigh 900 to 1,100 pounds (410 to 500 kg). The polo pony is selected carefully for quick bursts of speed, stamina, agility and manoeuvrability. Temperament is critical; the horse must remain responsive under pressure and not become excited or difficult to control. Many are Thoroughbreds or Thoroughbred crosses. They are trained to be handled with one hand on the reins, and to respond to the rider's leg and weight cues for moving forward, turning and stopping. A well trained horse will carry its rider smoothly and swiftly to the ball and can account for 60 to 75 percent of the player's skill and net worth to their team.

Polo pony training generally begins at age three and lasts from about six months to two years. Most horses reach full physical maturity at about age five, and ponies are at their peak of athleticism and training at around age six or seven. However, without any accidents, polo ponies may have the ability to play until they are eighteen to twenty years of age.

Each player must have more than one horse, to allow for tired mounts to be replaced by fresh ones between or even during chukkas. A player's "string" of polo ponies may number two or three in Low Goal matches (with ponies being rested for at least a chukka before reuse), four or more for Medium Goal matches (at least one per chukka), and even more for the highest levels of competition.

=== Saddle ===
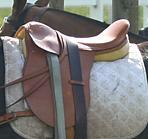
Polo saddle

Polo saddles are English-style, close contact, similar to jumping saddles; although most polo saddles lack a flap under the billets. Some players will not use a saddle blanket. The saddle has a flat seat and no knee support; the rider adopting a forward-leaning seat and closed knees dissimilar to a classical dressage seat. A breastplate is added, usually attached to the front billet. A standing martingale must be used: so, a breastplate is a necessity for safety. The tie-down is usually supported by a neck strap. Many saddles also have an overgirth. The stirrup irons are heavier than most, and the stirrup leathers are wider and thicker, for added safety when the player stands in the stirrups. The legs of the pony are wrapped with polo wraps from below the knee to the fetlock to minimize pain. Jumping (open front) or gallop boots are sometimes used along with the polo wraps for added protection. Often, these wraps match the team colours. The pony's mane is most often roached (hogged), and its tail is docked or braided so that it will not snag the rider's mallet.

Polo is ridden with double reins for greater accuracy of signals. The bit is frequently a gag bit or Pelham bit. In both cases, the gag or shank rein will be the bottom rein in the rider's hands, while the snaffle rein will be the top rein. One of the rein sets may alternately be draw reins.

== Indoor or arena polo ==
Arena polo is an indoor or semi-outdoor variant with similar rules to the outdoor polo version. It is played with three riders per team, and is less strenuous for the player. It is played in a enclosed arena.

The playing field in arena polo is smaller than outdoor polo. It is enclosed and usually made of compacted sand or fine aggregate. The enclosed area is much like those used for other equestrian sports 300 by 150 feet (91 by 46 m); the minimum size is 150 by 75 feet (46 by 23 m). Arena polo has more manoeuvering due to space limitations, and uses an air-inflated ball slightly larger than the hard solid ball used in field polo.

The indoor arena polo ball is often leather-covered and air-inflated. The ball must be not less than 12.5 inches (32 cm) or more than 15 inches (38 cm) in circumference. The weight must be between 170 grams (6.0 oz) and 182 grams (6.4 oz). In a bounce test from 9 feet (2.7 m) on concrete at 70 °F (21 °C), the rebound should be a minimum of 54 inches (140 cm) and a maximum of 64 inches (160 cm) at the inflation rate specified by the manufacturer. Some larger, custom-sized indoor balls are also available, such as 40 centimetres (16 in) diameter versions for specific conditions. This provides for a hard and lively ball.

Standard mallets are used, though slightly larger-head arena mallets are an option.

=== Clubs and tournament ===
There are many arena clubs in the United States, and most major polo clubs, including the Santa Barbara Polo and Racquet Club, have active arena programmes. The major differences between the outdoor and indoor games are: speed (outdoor being faster), physicality/roughness (indoor/arena is more physical), ball size (indoor is larger), goal size (because the arena is smaller the goal is smaller), and some penalties. In the United States and Canada, collegiate polo is arena polo; in the United Kingdom, collegiate polo is both.

Some of the most important arena polo tournaments held are:

- The U.S. Arena Polo Championship, a 12-18 goal tournament, is one of the highest levels of fast version of polo competition currently played in the United States. Its history dates back to 1926, where the first tournament was held and won by the Yale University team of Reddington Barret, Winston Guest and William Mui.
- The Arena Polo Grand Prix held in Argentina, promoted by La Carona Polo Club along with the Argentine Polo Association, was organized for the first time in June 2019, and was the start for the Arena Polo in Argentina.
- The Arena Polo European Championship. The first tournament of this championship was held in 2015. Alongside the Equestrian Federation of Azerbaijan Republic (ARAF) the tournament was organized by the team of World Polo

== Variants ==
These variants are considered sports separate from standard polo because of the differences in the composition of teams, equipment, rules and game facilities.

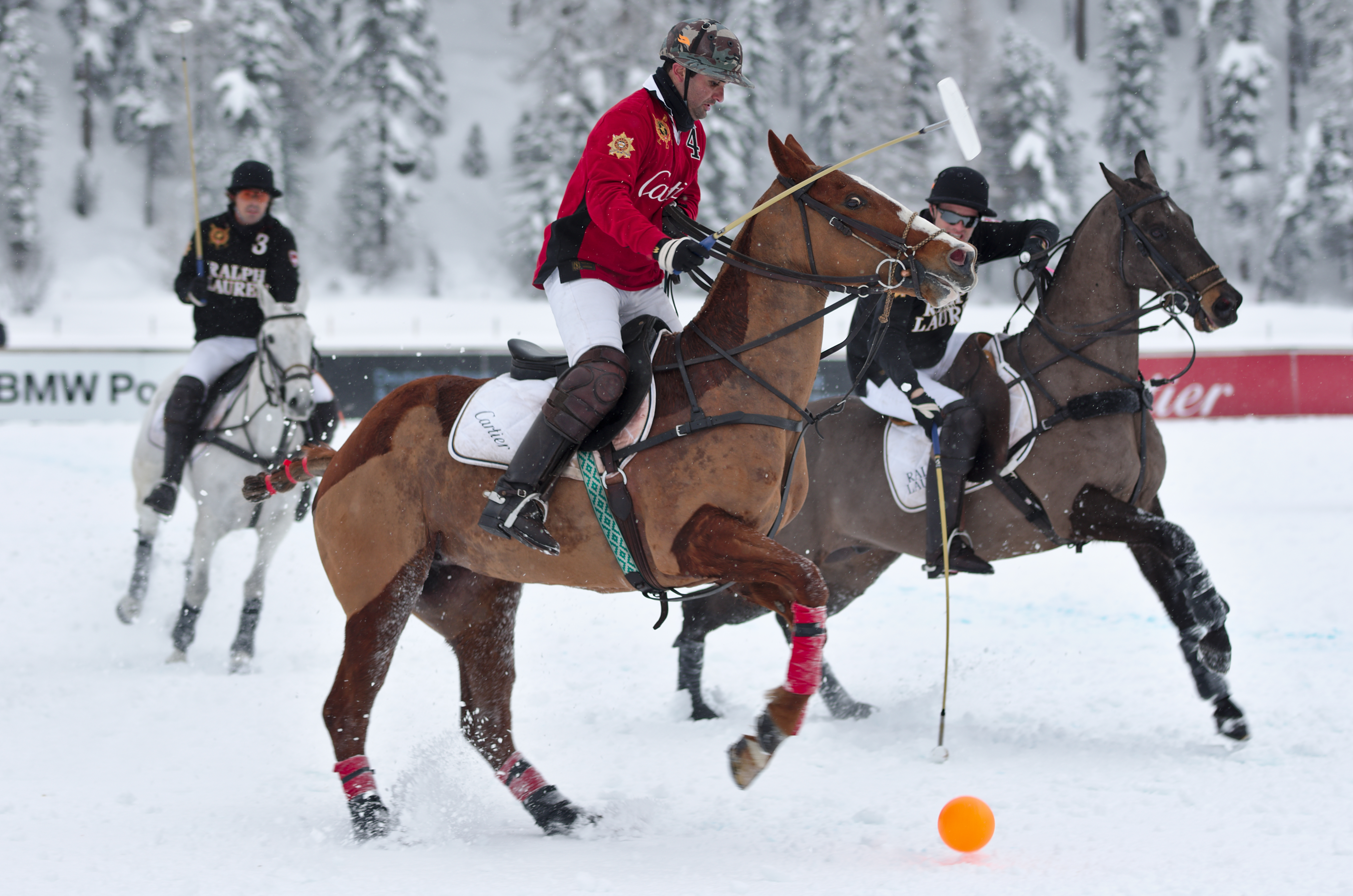
Snow polo played in St. Moritz, 2024

Snow polo is played on compacted snow on flat ground or a frozen lake. The format of snow polo varies depending on the space available. Each team generally consists of three players and a bright coloured light plastic ball is preferred. Snow polo is not the same sport as ice polo, which was popular in the US in the late 1890s. That sport resembled ice hockey and bandy but died out in favour of the Canadian ice hockey rules.

Variant forms of arena polo include beach polo, played in many countries between teams of three riders on a sand surface. Also, cowboy polo, played almost exclusively in the western United States by teams of five riders on a dirt surface, uses rules similar to regular polo. Riders compete with western saddles, usually in a smaller arena, using an inflatable rubber medicine ball.

Water polo shares a name with polo, but more closely resembles handball.

Variants that are related but diverge from the polo format include: Horseball, a game played on horseback where a ball is handled and points are scored by shooting it through a high net. The sport is a combination of polo, rugby, and basketball. Pato was played in Argentina for centuries, but is very different from modern polo. No mallets are used, and it is not played on grass. Polocrosse is a combination of polo and lacrosse and is also played on horseback. It was developed in Australia in the late 1930s.

=== Played on vehicles or other animals ===
Polo is not played exclusively on horseback. Such polo variants are mostly played for recreational or tourism purposes.

Non-equine variations include:

==== On other animals ====
Camel polo is played in Mongolia, Elephant polo is played in South Asia, and Yak polo is played in Mongolia and western China.

==== On vehicles ====
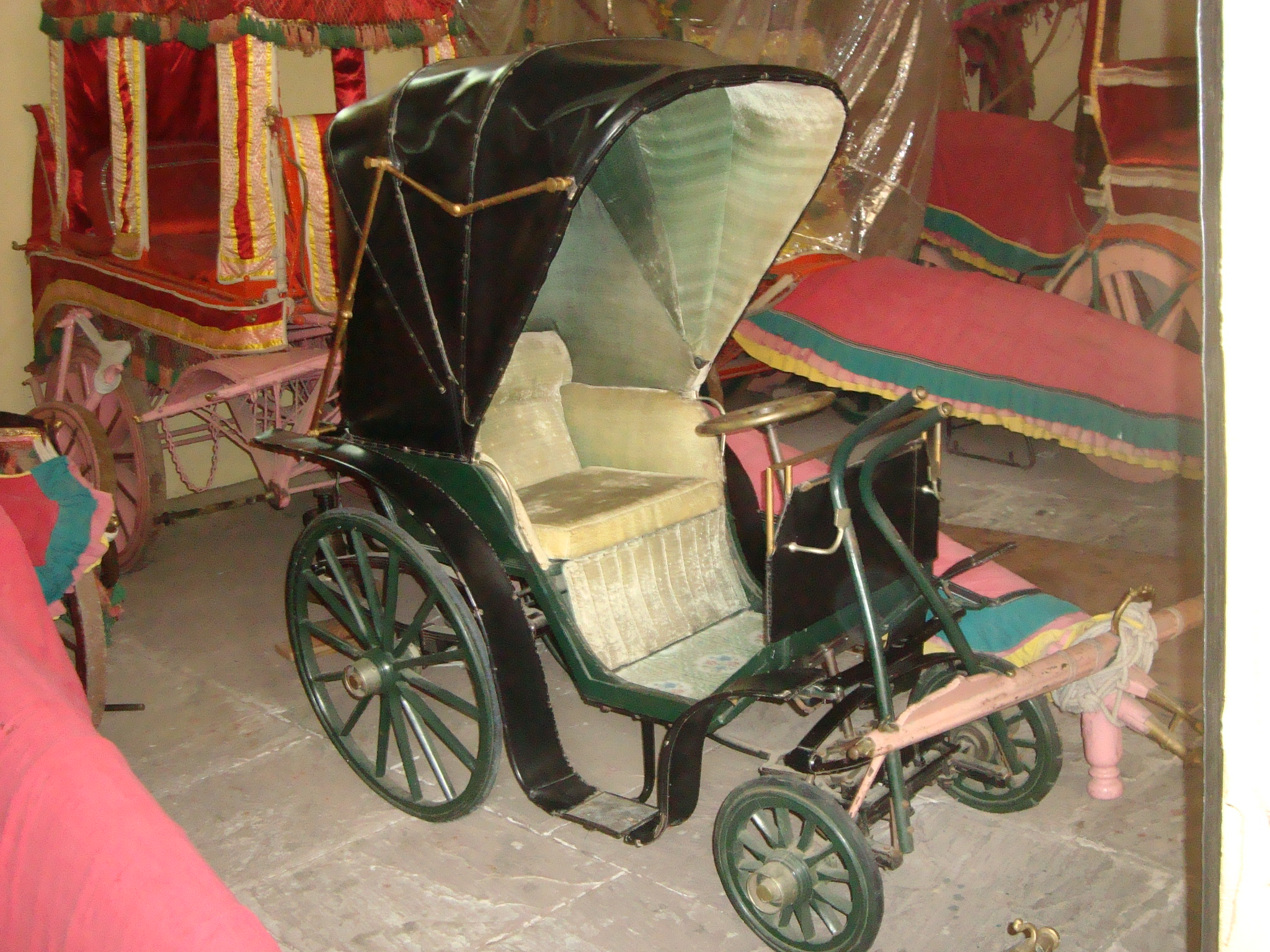
An old polocart displayed at City Palace, Jaipur. The museum also displays a "night polo ball" with a rotating platform on which a candle is placed.

Auto polo was a motorsport invented in the United States in the early 1900s. Its rules and equipment were similar to polo but automobiles were used instead of horses. Canoe polo is played around the world in kayaks and governed by the International Canoe Federation. Cycle polo is a similar game played on bicycles instead of horses. A variant of cycle polo is also played on penny-farthings. Motoball (motorcycle polo) was invented in the United States. Segway polo originated in the United States. Roda Polo is played on electric unicycles

==== Hobby horse polo ====
A lighthearted variant, hobby horse polo (German: Steckenpferdpolo), was devised in 1998 in south western Germany. The Erster Kurfürstlich-Kurpfälzisch Polo-Club in Mannheim was founded in 2002 to organise matches and promote the game. Since then, the variant has gained further interest in other German cities. It is played on hobby horses, the toy, instead of polo ponies. While following standard polo rules in part, it has some variation in rules: Goals are the height and width of bar stools; and any departure from accepted gameplay standards will attract "penalty sherries" to be consumed by the offending player.

== Popular culture ==
The sport inspired Jilly Cooper's 1991 bonkbuster novel Polo.

== See also ==
- Buzkashi
- Chovgan
- Sagol kāngjei
- Dakyu
- Jereed
- List of polo players
- PIPA Polo Instructors and Players Association
- Polo handicap
- World Polo Championship
- Water polo
