= United States Women's Polo Federation =

The United States Women's Polo Federation (USWPF) formerly coordinated the activities of its United States member teams, arranging and supervising women's professional polo matches and tournaments. It has now been merged with the United States Polo Association.
