= Ezra Cup =

Polo tournament in India

The Ezra Cup is a popular polo tournament conducted annually in India by the Calcutta Polo Club. It is claimed The Ezra Cup was first held in 1880. After a period of inactivity, it has now been revived by Keshav Bangur, Calcutta Polo Club's president.

== Keshav Bangur's patronage ==
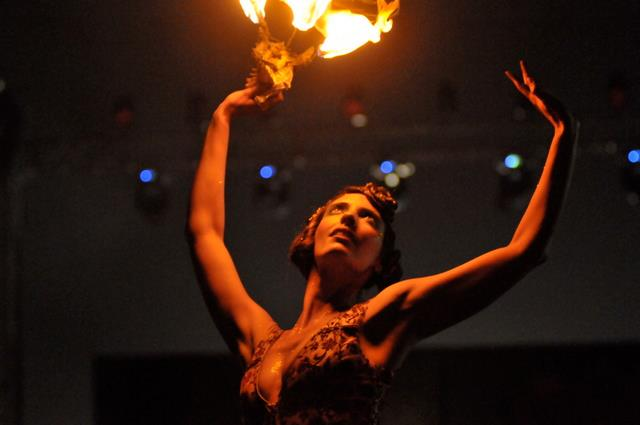
After party BFL Ezra Cup 2011

Ezra Cup is named after David Elias Ezra, a leading Jewish business tycoon in Calcutta who patronized the sport in the city. As part of its 150 years celebration, the Calcutta Polo Club organized Ezra World Cup at the Pat Williamson Ground, Kolkata from 18–25 December 2011. It has been doing so since 2006 when polo was revived in Kolkata by Calcutta Polo Club president Keshav Bangur.

After years of neglect the Calcutta Polo Club was put in cold storage by the army in 1998 through a resolution and the season was revived in 2006, at the initiative of Keshav Bangur. "We are happy that the army is cooperating with us to make the season a success now, and hope to get their continued support going forward," said Keshav Bangur, CPC's current president.

== Revival ==
Despite the claimed legacy of being the world's oldest polo club, the Calcutta Polo Club almost disappeared before being revived by Keshav Bangur. In 2006, after almost a decade of inactivity, the first tournament was held. In 2011, teams from India, the United States, Italy, Brazil and Indonesia competed for the Ezra Cup.

"Time was when major-generals and personages in high political office stood up in the grandstand waving their hats and shouting themselves hoarse, as the women, resplendent in their silk finery, screamed during a hearty game of polo on the Pat Williamson Ground at Calcutta’s race course." Polo can no longer look to its royal patrons for support, says Keshav Bangur. "It’s beyond the means of most of these estates to back the sport." The sport has found new patrons, though, according to Gaj Singh. "Availability of grounds is the biggest problem facing Indian polo," says Singh—not lack of patronage. Besides companies such as Keshav Bangur’s BFL Corporation Limited, Naveen Jindal’s Jindal Steel and Power Limited and Sunjay Kapur’s Sona Koyo Steering Systems Limited, which have fielded and backed polo teams, the sport has had a lot of support from the army.

Carlos Gracida, captain of the team from the US, suggests a scope for revival. He says that in Argentina, the country prominent in the world of polo, the sport has become popular among the masses to a great extent. "The young in Argentina are drawn to the sport because they can make a living out of it," says Gracida.

== 2011 winners ==
The local side, Calcutta Polo Club emerged as the champion of the BFL Corp Ezra World Cup 2011, defeating the team from Italy, Rome, by 6 goals to 4.5. Starting with an advantage of 0.5 goals, Rome began well but failed to sustain the tempo against CPC, which played a fluent and effective game. George Meyrick led the scoring for CPC with three goals. Major Vishal Chauhan added a brace while Colonel Tarun Sirohi scored the solitary field goal. For Rome, Gofferdo C. Rendina scored two and Santiago Buzzi scored a brace.

Earlier, Rome qualified for the final by defeating what was arguably the best team of the tournament, Carnoustie of the US, by a narrow margin of 0.5 goal. The final score read 5.5 to 5 goals in favour of Rome. The spectators witnessed great heroics by Carlos Gracida, perhaps the highest handicap player in the world. Playing for Carnoustie, he scored all the five goals. For Rome, which enjoyed a 0.5-goal handicap, Boris Bignoli got one and Gofferdo C. Rendina scored the rest.The tournament also had a team from Indonesia called Nausantara. It failed to make an impact on the meet while the other Indian team, Army Polo Riding Club, caused a few surprises before bowing out.

== 2011 celebrations ==
The grand finale of the seven-day celebration of BFL Corp Ezra World Cup 2011 was staged at the Pat Williamson ground.

On 25 December, the players from Manipur, with a traditional Manipuri Polo Match, gave the spectators a glimpse of history. The army band gave a performance of flute, pipes and drums.

The CPC, headed by its president, Keshav Bangur, commented on organising the event. "It's a moment of pride for me and the committee members to have hosted the Ezra Cup and to have brought the world of polo population together to this magnificent venue. We had a terrific tournament and the game was celebrated in its full glory. This is just the beginning of the celebration of the 150th year of the club and I feel very happy and proud to have led the show along with the relentless support of the Indian Polo Association and the Indian Army. I wish to encourage young players in the city to actively participate and join this game,"

The event saw performances by bubble and fire dancers, who were flown in from different parts of the country. The event saw polo celebrities like Colquhoun-Denvers and international players like George Meurick, Gabriel Nicolas Curto, Carlos Gracida and Goffredo C Rendina, amongst others.

== Calcutta Polo Club ==
A press report commented, "The current club membership is about 200, with members from the business and royal families of Cooch Behar, Burdwan, Darbhanga and the illustrious Mullickbari of north Kolkata. Pat Williamson Polo Ground in Kolkata overlooks the Victoria Memorial and has seen polo stalwarts like Maharaja Sawai Man Singh of Jaipur and Maharaj Prem Singh. The legendary Gayatri Devi, the princess of Cooch Behar, fell in love with her future husband Sawai Man Singh at this polo ground."

Two British soldiers, Robert Stewart and Joe Shearer, saw a game called sagol kangjei played by locals on horses in Manipur. Impressed by this game, the soldiers introduced it to their peers in Kolkata and in 1862, the Calcutta Polo Club was founded with the subsequent creation of a new format. The club stable for horses is near the second Hooghly Bridge. The Indian Army continues to support the club, allowing it to use the Pat Williamson Polo Ground, which falls under the jurisdiction of the Indian Army’s Eastern Command.

Earlier, most of the key players, like Maharaj Prem Singh, a seven-handicapper, and Col Kishen Singh, a six-handicapper, were based in Kolkata and other leading players from elsewhere rallied round them.

As part of the 2011 Ezra Cup, a History Gallery was opened at the Pat Williamson Ground, and a coffee table book was released that showcases the history and heritage of the Calcutta Polo Club.
