= Calcutta Polo Club =

Polo club in Kolkata, India

Calcutta Polo Club ক্যালকাটা পোলো ক্লাব
- Founded: 1862
- Based in: Kolkata
- Stadium: Pat Williamson Ground
- President: Keshav Bangur
- Website: www.calcuttapolo.com

Calcutta Polo Club is a polo club located in Kolkata, West Bengal, India. It was established in 1862 and is considered to be the world's oldest operational polo club.

== History ==
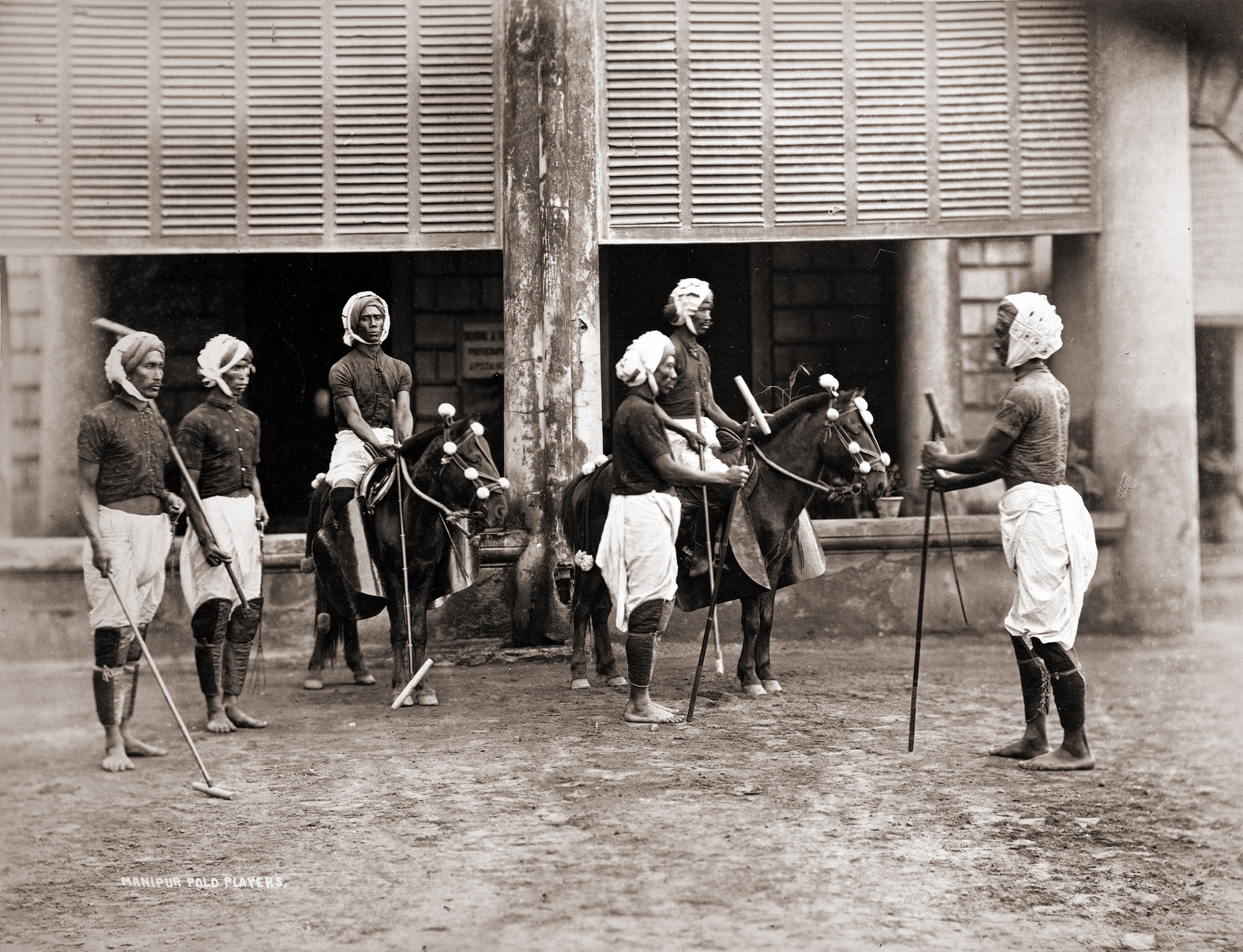

The modern game of polo, though formalised and popularised by the British, is derived from Manipur (now a state in India) who played the game known as 'Sagol Kangjei', 'Kanjai-bazee', or 'Pulu'. It was the anglicised form of the latter, referring to the wooden ball which was used, that was adopted by the sport in its slow spread to the west.

In 1862 the Calcutta Polo Club was established by two British soldiers, Captain Robert Stewart and (later Major General) Joe Sherer. They were inspired by the game in Manipur and later they spread the game to their peers in England.

The club runs the oldest and first ever Polo Trophy, the Ezra Cup (1880), besides other old ones such as the Carmichael Cup (1910) and the Stewarts Cup (1932). In earlier days matches were played between various royal dynasties of India.

After a period of inactivity, the club was rejuvenated, hosting a two-week polo tournament, the "BFL Corporation Polo Season", in December 2006.

== Activities ==
Calcutta Polo Club

The club provides advanced professional training in polo to aspiring professionals and amateurs. Members can keep their own horses in the club stables, or can book or use any of the horses available in the club. Students can enroll in a special subsidised student training programme in polo. Apart from training, the club organises various polo tournaments, which are mostly held in December in the Pat Williamson Ground, popularly known as Polo Grounds in Kolkata.

== CPC's patronage of Ezra Cup ==
Ezra Cup, the first ever polo trophy in the world, is named after Sir David Ezra, a leading Jewish business tycoon in Calcutta who patronized the sport in the city. The first Ezra Cup was held in 1880.

As part of its 150 years celebration, the Calcutta Polo Club organized Ezra World Cup at the Pat Williamson Ground, Kolkata from 18–25 December 2011. It has been doing so since 2006 when the game was revived in Kolkata by Calcutta Polo Club president Keshav Bangur.

Calcutta Polo Club is in its 150th year making it the oldest polo club in the world still in existence, and the hosts made the 2011 season a treat to remember. Calcutta is also home to the oldest polo ground in the world still in use — Pat Williamson, most suited for the Ezra Cup- also the oldest polo trophy in the world.

After years of neglect the Calcutta Polo Club was put in cold storage by the army in 1998 through a resolution and the season was revived in 2006, at the initiative of Keshav Bangur. "We are happy that the army is cooperating with us to make the season a success now, and hope to get their continued support going forward," said the president of the polo club, well aware of the challenges ahead.

== Popularizing polo with masses ==
Very young kids are made to walk under the feet of polo ponies and mount the horses at the Calcutta Polo Club. "We do all this to familiarize the children with the horses. This has to be done so that the children lose their fear. Just after they join, we make the children pass under the horses. Once they climb the mounts, they are made to perform all kinds of exercises. They have to stretch their bodies to either side while controlling the horses. After all, they are being trained for polo where they have to learn other skills apart from riding," said Keshav Bangur in an interview to Times of India.

As a part of a range of initiatives from Keshav Bangur of the CPC, which has turned 150 in 2011, a lot is being done promote the sport in the city. The sport of polo has been thrown open to the youngsters. Till recently, polo was considered a sport fit for kings because of being an expensive sport and the middle-class preferred to stay away till Keshav Bangur announced a special scheme for students.

"All one needs to do is download a form from the internet, fill it up and submit it with a certificate from the school principal. The charges for the two-month course are a bare minimum that any parent can afford. From every batch that comes in, a few stay back to continue with full-fledged polo. The remaining go back trained in riding. In this way, we now have 20 boys and girls playing full-fledged polo," Keshav Bangur said.

The CPC have a veteran from the 61st Cavalry of the Indian Army — the largest non-ceremonial horse-mounted cavalry unit in the world — to handle the training and stabling aspects. While the children are learning the ropes, so are the "sahis", or helpers. One of them has become a full-fledged polo player already and is eligible to earn Rs 12,500 in any tournament he participates in. "Kolkata is now again emerging as an important location for polo. Nowadays, people are coming to the city to purchase polo ponies," Bangur said.

== Officials ==
Keshav Bangur, CEO of BFL Corporation is the president of Calcutta Polo Club. He was instrumental in bringing back the club to its former glories.
