= Hissam Ali Haider =

Pakistani polo player

Hissam Ali Hyder born March 7, 1982, in Lahore, is a +6 goal Pakistani polo player.

Hissam, also known as "Namoo", learnt how to play polo from his father Irfan Ali Haider, who was a +4 goal player.
