= Thoksikhar =

Mosque in Khaplu valley, Pakistan

Thoksikhar Mosque توق سی کھَر
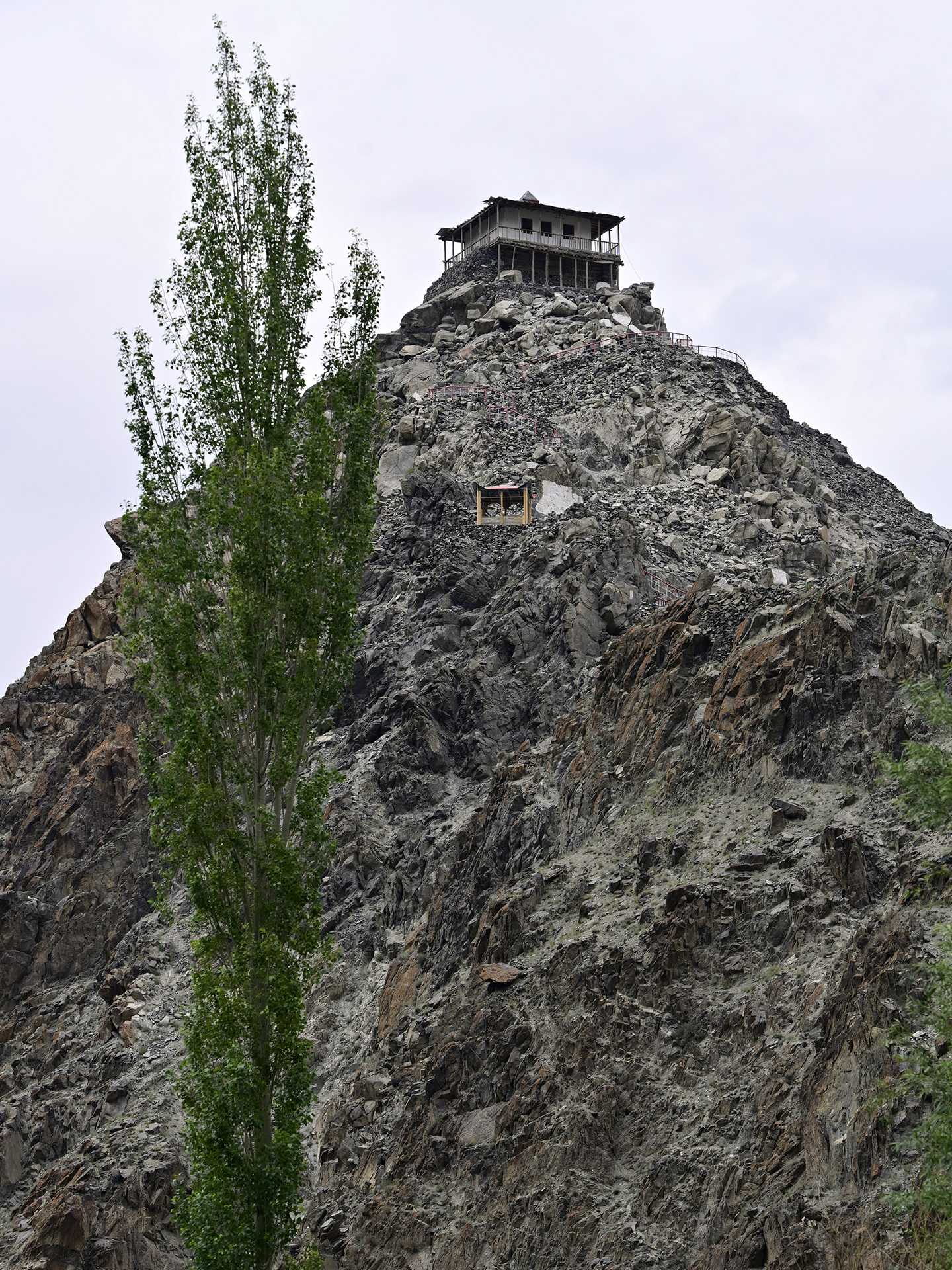
- Thoksikhar Mosque perched on a mountaintop above Khaplu Valley

- Location within Gilgit Baltistan Location within Pakistan
- 35.1697°N 76.3346°E
- Location: Khaplu, Ghanche District, Gilgit-Baltistan

History
- Built: 14th century

Site notes
- Restored: Ongoing local conservation

Thoksikhar (also known as Thoqsi Khar or Thoksi Ghar) is a mosque located in the Khaplu Valley in Gilgit-Baltistan, Pakistan. The mosque, situated on the summit of a rocky mountain, is a popular destination for both hiking and religious pilgrimage, offering panoramic views of the surrounding valleys and mountains.

== Location ==
Thoksikhar Mosque is located in the Khaplu Valley, within the easternmost district of Ghanche in Gilgit-Baltistan. The mosque sits at an elevation of over 2,700 meters above sea level, overlooking the valley and the distant mountain ranges.

== Historical background ==
The mosque holds cultural and religious significance for the local community. Its traditional Islamic architecture, combined with its mountaintop location, has made it a site of spiritual reflection and regional heritage.

== Hiking trails ==
The main trail to Thoksikhar begins in Gharbuchang Village, situated at the base of the mountain. Hikers ascend along a rugged path to reach the mosque, and a short further walk leads to a lookout point that offers sweeping views of the Khaplu Valley. From this vantage point, the Shabshi Polo Ground is particularly notable.

== Gallery ==
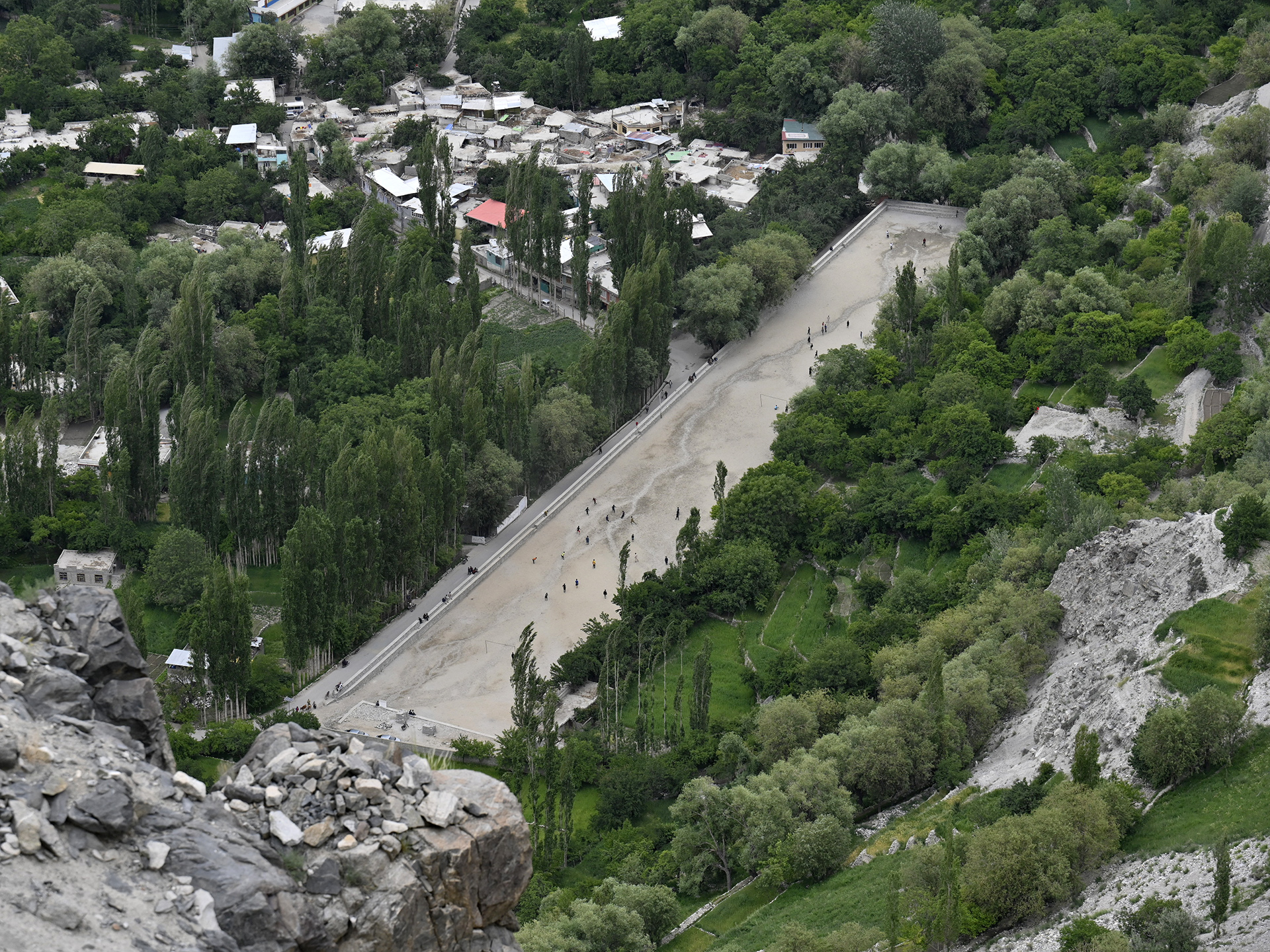
View of the Shabshi (Yabgo) Polo Ground in Khaplu Valley, as seen from Thoksikhar Mosque.

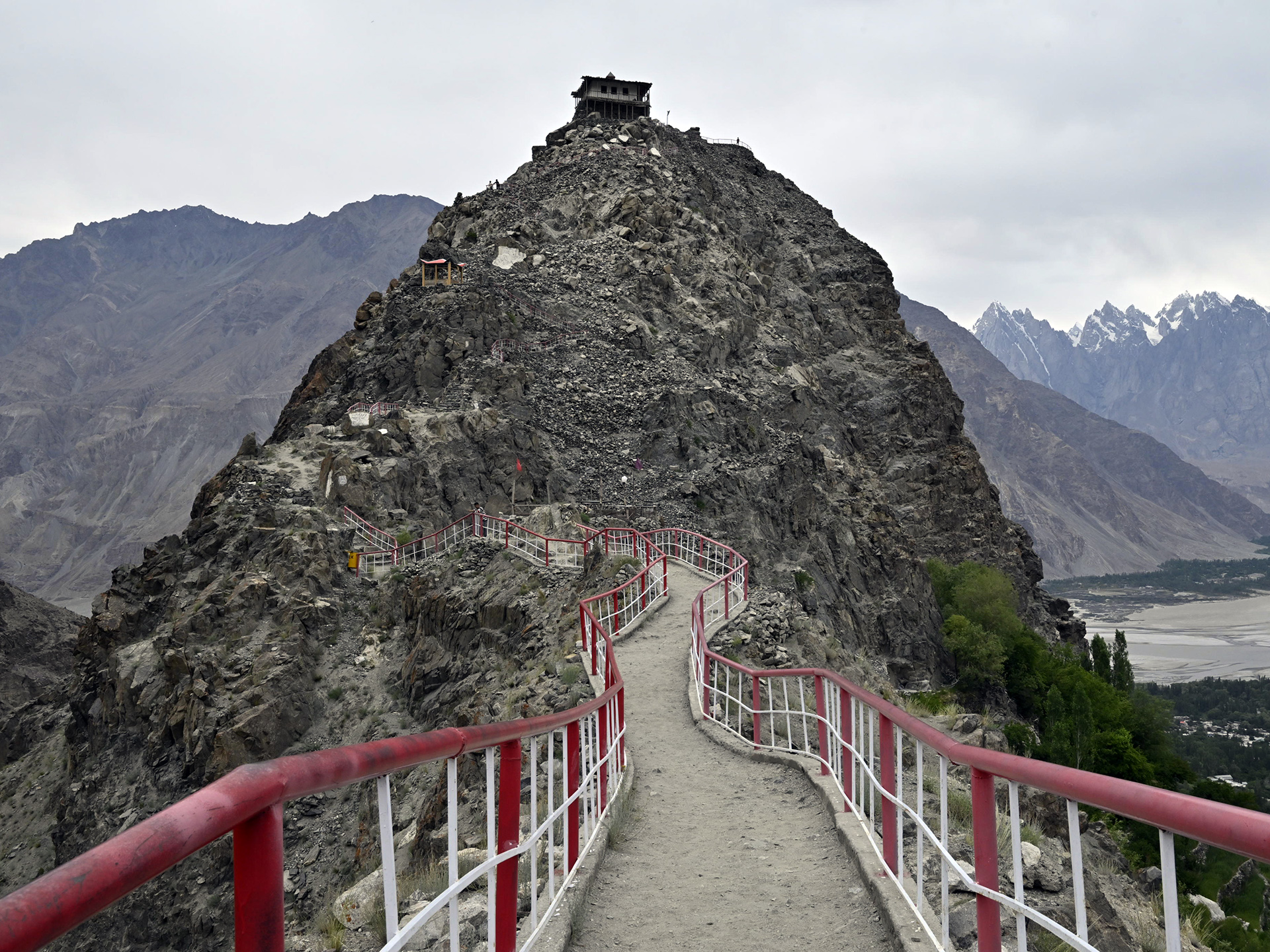
The hiking trail leading from Khaplu Valley to Thoksikhar Mosque.

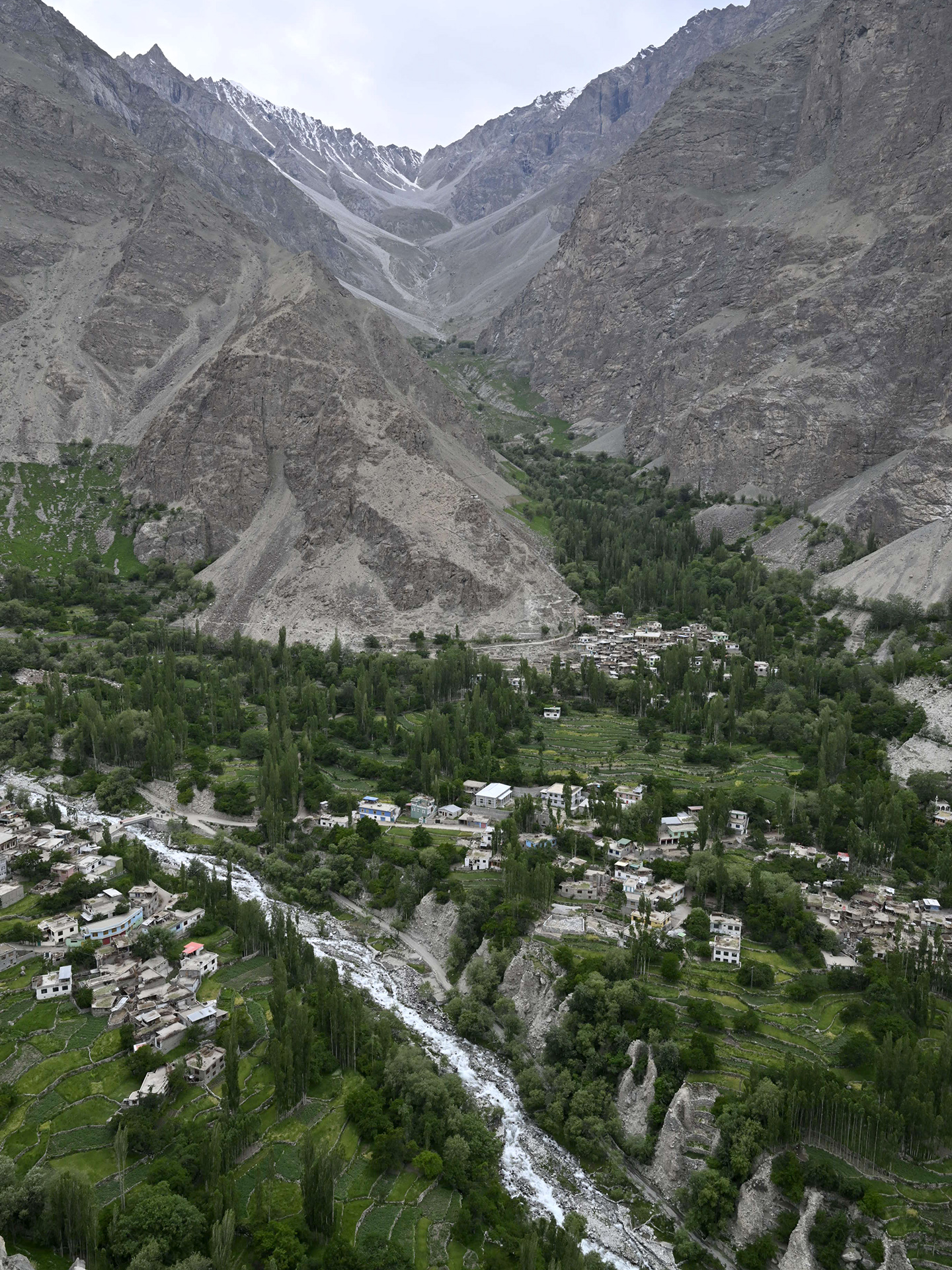
Panoramic view of Khaplu Valley and Gharbuchang Village, as seen from the Thoksikhar lookout.
