= Tskhenburti =

Equestrian team sport

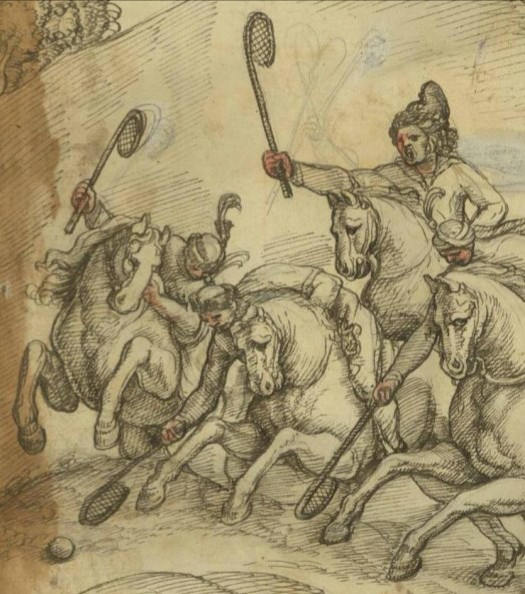
- Georgians playing Tskhenburti in the Kingdom of Imereti. Painting by Teramo Castelli, 1640

Characteristics
- Contact: Yes
- Team members: 6
- Type: Equestrian, ball game, team sport
- Equipment: Polo pony, racket, ball, protective wear
- Venue: Polo field or arena

Presence
- Country or region: Georgia

Tskhenburti (Georgian: ცხენბურთი, romanized: tskhenburti, literally Horseball) is a traditional Georgian racket and ball game that is played on horseback.

Along with other traditional Georgian equestrian sports, including Isindi, Kabakhi and Marula, Tskhenburti is recognized as an intangible cultural heritage monument of Georgia.

During the feudal period of Georgian history, Tskhenburti was used as a means of military and physical training. Its rules were subsequently developed and standardized, and conditions for organized competitions were established. The game is particularly popular in western Georgia.

== Rules and gameplay ==
Tskhenburti is played between two teams of six riders each, one of whom serves as the goalkeeper. Matches are played on a level field measuring approximately 150–300 metres (490–980 ft) in length and 75–120 metres (246–394 ft) in width. Flags are placed at the corners of the field.

The goals are approximately 6 metres (20 ft) wide and 3.5 metres (11.5 ft) high. A penalty area measuring approximately 10–20 metres (33–66 ft) is marked in front of each goal. A central circle with a diameter of 5 metres (16 ft) is marked at the midpoint of the field.

The principal equipment consists of a dense ball and wooden rackets with a netted metal hoop at the end. The objective is to carry or strike the ball into the opposing team's goal, with players permitted to touch the ball only with the racket.

A match consists of two 10-minute periods of playing time, for a total of 20 minutes. Time used for restarting play from the sidelines, penalty situations and contested balls is not included in the playing time. The two periods are separated by a 15-minute interval.

At the beginning of each period and after a goal is scored, the referee, who is also mounted on horseback, restarts play by throwing the ball upwards at the centre of the field. Assistant referees operate along the sidelines.
