= Cowdin =

Cowdin is a surname. Notable people with the surname include:

- Elliot Cowdin (1819–1880), American businessman and politician
- Elliott Christopher Cowdin II (1886–1933), American WWI veteran
- John Cheever Cowdin (1889–1960), American financier and polo player
- John Elliot Cowdin (1858–1941), American polo player
- Robert Cowdin (1805–1874), American businessman, Civil War veteran, and politician
