= George Eustis Jr. =

American politician

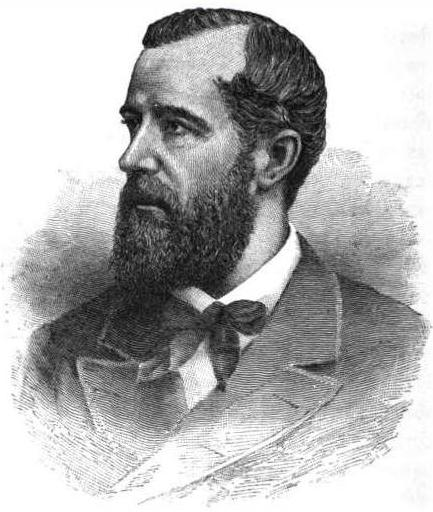

Member of the U.S. House of Representatives from Louisiana's 1st district
- In office March 4, 1855 – March 3, 1859
- Preceded by: William Dunbar
- Succeeded by: J. E. Bouligny

Personal details
- Born: September 28, 1828 New Orleans, Louisiana, US
- Died: March 15, 1872 (aged 43) Cannes, Alpes-Maritimes, France
- Party: American Party
- Spouse: Louise Morris Corcoran (m. 1859; died 1867)
- Relations: James Biddle Eustis (brother); Tommy Hitchcock Jr. (grandson)
- Children: William Corcoran Eustis; George Peabody Eustis; Louise Mary Eustis
- Parent(s): George Eustis Sr. Clarice Allain Eustis
- Education: Jefferson College; Harvard Law School
- Occupation: Lawyer, politician, diplomat

George Eustis Jr. (September 28, 1828 – March 15, 1872) was an American lawyer and politician.

== Early life ==
Eustis was born in New Orleans on September 28, 1828. He was the namesake and eldest son of George Eustis Sr. and Clarisse Duralde Eustis (née Allain). His father was a lawyer who served as a Chief Justice of the Louisiana Supreme Court. Among his siblings was brother James Biddle Eustis, a U.S. Senator and Ambassador to France. In 1850, the last census of his life, his father owned 10 slaves in New Orleans, two of whom were classified as mulatto.

His paternal grandparents were Jacob Eustis and Elizabeth Saunders (née Gray) Eustis and his maternal grandparents were Valérien Allain and Céleste (née Duralde) Allain. His mother was the niece of Julie Duralde Clay, a sister-in-law of statesman Henry Clay through her marriage to Clay's brother John Clay.

Eustis graduated from Jefferson College in Convent, Louisiana, and obtained a law degree from Harvard Law School.

== Career ==
After graduation from law school, he was admitted to the bar and practiced in Louisiana before becoming involved in politics.

He was a member of Congress and then later secretary to John Slidell during the Civil War. He became a member of the United States House of Representatives representing Louisiana. He served two terms, from March 4, 1855, to March 3, 1859, as a member of the anti-immigration American Party.

During the U.S. Civil War, he was a Confederate Military Aide to Louisiana Senator John Slidell and was captured along with Slidell and James Murray Mason aboard the steamer RMS Trent by Union Navy Captain Charles Wilkes in what became known as the Trent Affair. Eustis followed Slidell to Paris, where he served as Secretary of the Confederate mission there.

== Personal life ==
In April 1859, Eustis was married to Louise Morris Corcoran (1838–1867), the only surviving daughter of Louise (née Morris) Corcoran and William Wilson Corcoran, a banker and philanthropist who co-founded the Riggs Bank. Her grandfathers were mayor Thomas Corcoran and naval officer Charles Morris. Together, they were the parents of two sons and a daughter:

- William Corcoran Eustis (1862–1921), who married Edith Livingston Morton (1874–1964), daughter of U.S. Vice President Levi Parsons Morton and a descendant of the Livingston family of New York, in 1900.
- George Peabody Eustis (Note: Later in life, George Peabody Eustis took the maiden name of his mother as his surname and became known as George Eustis Corcoran.) (1864–1936), who married his first cousin Marie Eustis (1866–1956), only daughter of James B. Eustis, in 1887. They divorced in 1901, and she married pianist Josef Hofmann in 1905, and he remarried to Rosamund K. Street, daughter of William Street, in 1908.
- Louise Mary Eustis (1867–1934), who married steeplechase horse racing trainer Thomas Hitchcock in 1891.

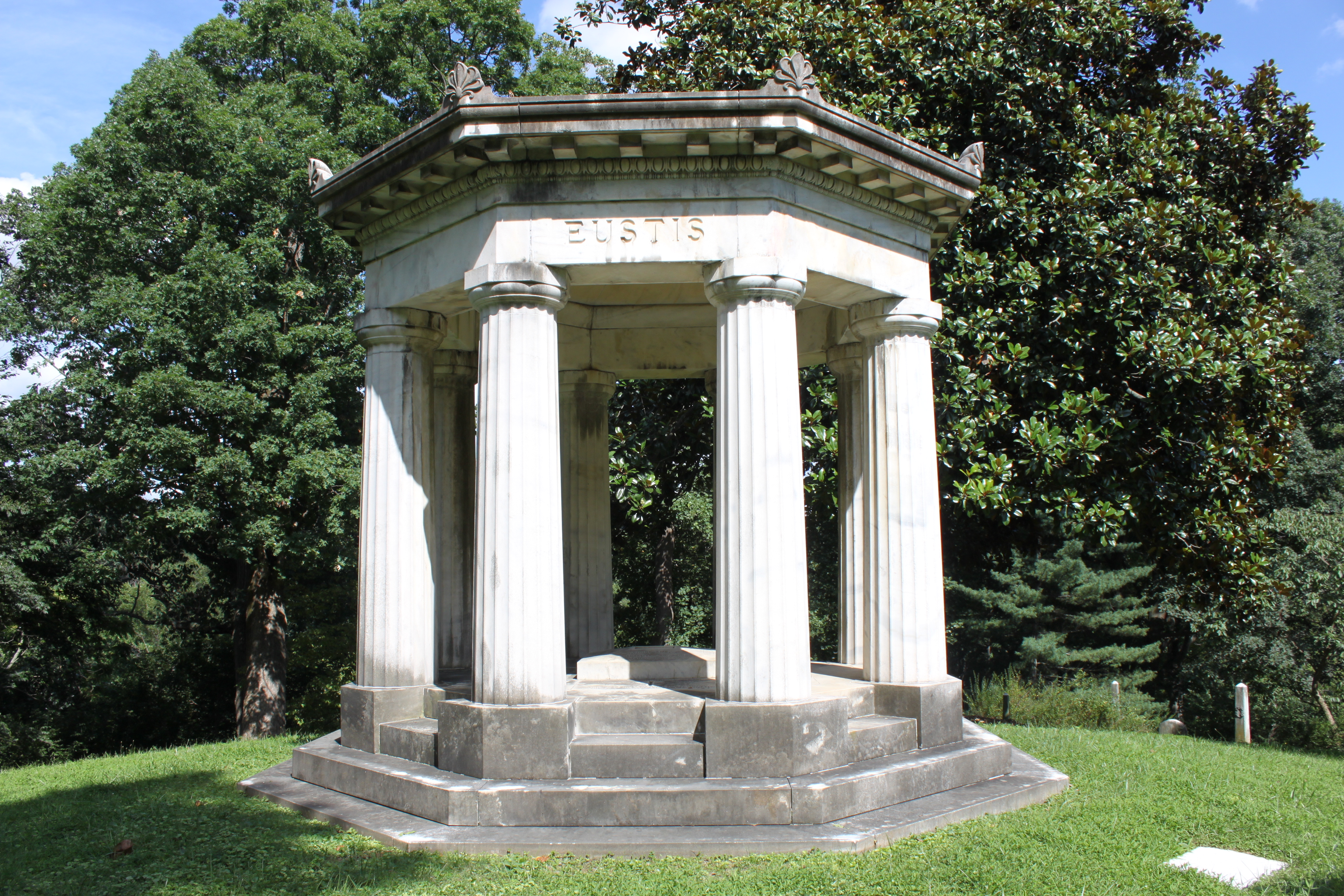
Grave of Eustis in Oak Hill Cemetery

He died in of tuberculosis in Cannes, France, on March 15, 1872. His body was brought to the United States and interred in the Oak Hill Cemetery in Washington, D.C.

=== Descendants ===
Through his son George, he was a grandfather of George Morris Eustis (1899–1961) and Lucinda Eustis Corcoran (born Lucinda Morgan Corcoran Eustis).

Through his daughter Louise, he was a grandfather of Celestine Eustis Hitchcock (1892–1935), who married New York City architect Julian Livingston Peabody and died with him aboard the SS Mohawk; Thomas Hitchcock Jr. (1900–1944), who married Margaret Mellon (daughter of William Larimer Mellon Sr.); Francis Center Eustis Hitchcock, who married, and divorced, Mary Atwell; and Helen Hitchcock (d. 1979), who married James Averell Clark, (son of George Crawford Clark, a founder of Clark, Dodge & Co.) in 1919.

U.S. House of Representatives
Preceded by William Dunbar	Member of the U.S. House of Representatives from Louisiana's 1st congressional district 1855–1859	Succeeded by J. E. Bouligny
