= John Cowdin =

John Cowdin may refer to:

- John Elliot Cowdin, American polo player
- John Cheever Cowdin, his son, American financier and polo player
