= Charles A. Peabody Jr. =

American politician

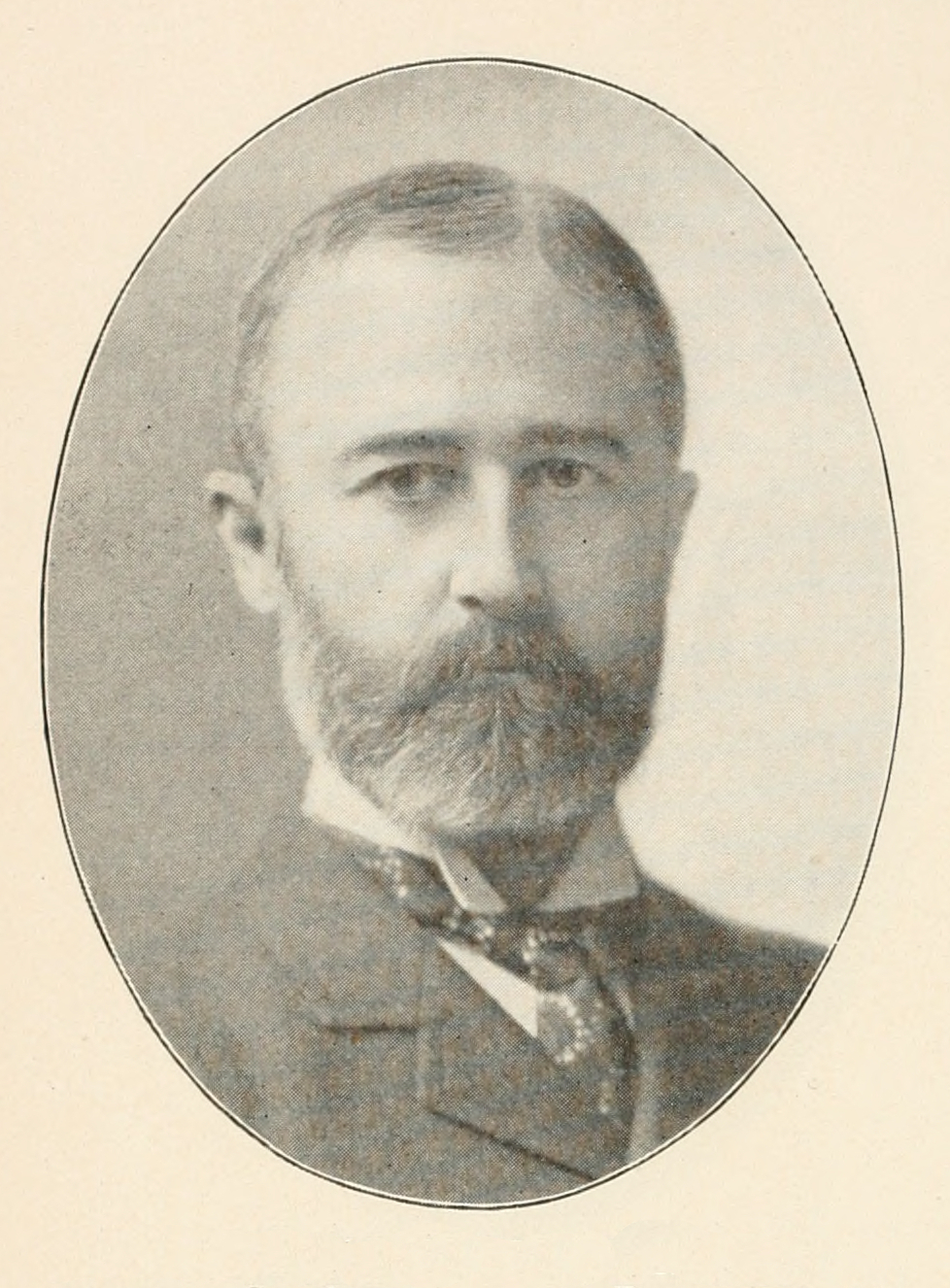

Member of the New York State Assembly from the 11th district
- In office January 1, 1876 – December 31, 1876
- Preceded by: Knox McAfee
- Succeeded by: Elliot C. Cowdin

Personal details
- Born: Charles Augustus Peabody, Jr. April 11, 1849 New York City, New York, U.S.
- Died: April 26, 1931 (aged 82) New York City, New York, U.S.
- Party: Republican
- Spouse: Charlotte Anita Damon (m. 1880; died 1912)
- Children: 3
- Parent(s): Charles Augustus Peabody; Julia Caroline Livingston
- Education: Columbia University; Columbia Law School

Charles Augustus Peabody Jr. (April 11, 1849 – April 26, 1931) was an American politician, lawyer, and prominent figure in New York banking and insurance.

== Early life ==
Peabody was born on April 11, 1849, in New York City. He was one of four children of Judge Charles Augustus Peabody (1814–1901) and, his first wife, Julia Caroline (née Livingston) Peabody (1816–1878) who married at Trinity Church in 1846. Among his siblings was brother Dr. George Livingston Peabody (who married Jane de Peyster Huggins), Philip Glendower Peabody and Julia Livingston Peabody (the wife of Charles J. Nourse). After his mother's death in 1878, his father remarried to Mary Eliza Hamilton. Mary was a cousin of Mrs. Astor, a daughter of John Church Hamilton and granddaughter of Alexander Hamilton, one of the Founding Fathers of the United States. His father served one term on the Supreme Court of New York and was appointed a Provisional Judge in the District of New Orleans by President Abraham Lincoln. After Mary's death in 1887, he married for a third time to Athenia Livingston (née Bowen), the widow of James Bowen (his "old-time warm friend and associate") and daughter of Anthony Rutgers Livingston (brother to U.S. Representative Robert Le Roy Livingston).

A Boston Brahmin, his paternal grandparents were Samuel Peabody (son of Capt. Richard Peabody of the Revolutionary War who commanded a Company at Fort Ticonderoga and Lake George) and Abigail (née Wood) Peabody. His maternal grandparents were James Duane Livingston and Sarah (née Swift) Livingston. Among his maternal family, all descendants of Robert Livingston, the 3rd Lord of Livingston Manor, was aunt Alice Craufurd Livingston (wife of John Howard Tillotson), uncle Charles James Livingston (husband of Charlotte Lucia Merry) and aunt Louisa Livingston (wife of Oliver Hewlett Jones).

Peabody attended Columbia University, where he played on the college's football team and was a member of the Fraternity of Delta Psi (St. Anthony Hall), graduating with the class of 1869, before attending Columbia Law School, where he graduated in 1871.

== Career ==
After his admission to the bar in the 1870s, Peabody became a member of his father's firm, Peabody, Baker & Peabody, a law office at 2 Wall Street in downtown Manhattan. In 1875, Peabody was elected to represent New York County's 11th district in the 99th New York State Legislature, serving from January 1 until December 31, 1876, when he was succeeded by Elliot C. Cowdin. His father ran for Surrogate in 1876.

After his father's death in 1901, the firm continued under the name Baker & Peabody with Fisher Ames Baker as senior partner. Baker was the uncle of George Fisher Baker, former president of Astor National Bank, of which Peabody served as the first vice-president upon its formation in 1898.

From 1893, until shortly before his death, Peabody was a trustee of the estate of the first John Jacob Astor, and was associated with William Waldorf Astor for many years as his representative in the United States after Astor moved to England. Peabody also assisted with the creation of the Harriman State Park in 1910, through Mary Williamson Harriman (widow of railroad executive E. H. Harriman, with whom Peabody worked extensively) and Governor Charles Evans Hughes.

After the "sensational insurance investigations by the Armstrong committee," Peabody was appointed president of the Mutual Life Insurance Company on January 1, 1906, and worked from 32 Nassau Street. When asked for an autobiography at the time of his appointment, he replied:

"I am a lawyer and have practiced in this city for about thirty years. There is nothing very exciting about my professional career. The only break in it was a short period during which I served in the State Legislature. The story of my life is just like that of a hundred other lawyers who work all the time at their profession and take an occasional day off on which to play."

By the time of his retirement from Mutual Life on September 1, 1927, he was "recognized as a leader in the advance of life insurance in America," and "in increasing the soundness of its foundations and in raising the esteem in which the business is held by the public." Peabody was succeeded as president by David F. Houston, the former U.S. Secretary of the Treasury and Agriculture (under President Woodrow Wilson). At various times throughout his life, he served on the board of directors, or trustees, of City Bank-Farmers Trust Company, Mutual Life Insurance Company, Wells Fargo & Co., the Astor Trust Company, Oregon Short Line Railroad, Central of Georgia Railway, Church Pension Fund, Delaware and Hudson Company (where he was a member of the board of managers), the Illinois Central Railroad and the Union Pacific Railroad.

== Personal life ==
On January 27, 1880, Peabody was married to Charlotte Anita Damon (1842–1912), the daughter of Anita (née Fales) Damon and John Wade Damon. Together, they lived at 224 Madison Avenue in New York and had a country place at Cold Spring Harbor on Long Island. Charlotte and Charles were the parents of two boys and one girl, including:

- Julian Livingston Peabody (1881–1935), an architect who married Celestine Eustis Hitchcock, daughter of Thomas Hitchcock Sr. and niece of William Corcoran Eustis. Both Julian and his wife died in the marine disaster, the sinking of the SS Mohawk off the coast of New Jersey in January 1935.
- John Damon Peabody (1883–1944), a 1906 Harvard graduate who married Mary Cunningham Bishop, daughter of James Cunningham Bishop.
- Anita Livingston Peabody (1884–1960), who married polo player Hamilton Haddon (1885–1963), the son of J. E. Smith Hadden, in 1913.

Peabody was a member of the University Club, the Metropolitan Club, the Piping Rock Club, the Tuxedo Club, and was a member of the Sons of the Revolution.

His wife died at their Madison Avenue home in New York City on February 3, 1912. After his wife's death, Peabody moved to 635 Park Avenue on Manhattan's Upper East Side, where he died on April 26, 1931. After a funeral at the Church of the Resurrection at 119 East 74th Street, he was buried alongside his wife at Mount Auburn Cemetery in Cambridge, Massachusetts.

=== Descendants ===
Through his eldest son, he was a grandfather of Julian Livingston Peabody Jr. (1914–2014), a lawyer with LeBoeuf, Lamb, Leiby, and Daphne Peabody, who married Edward Eugene Murray, a Dartmouth College graduate who was the son of the Democratic Senator from Montana, James E. Murray, in 1944.

New York State Assembly
Preceded by Knox McAfee	New York State Assembly; New York County, 11th District; 1876	Succeeded by Elliot Cowdin
