= Thomas Hitchcock Sr. =

American polo player (1860-1941)

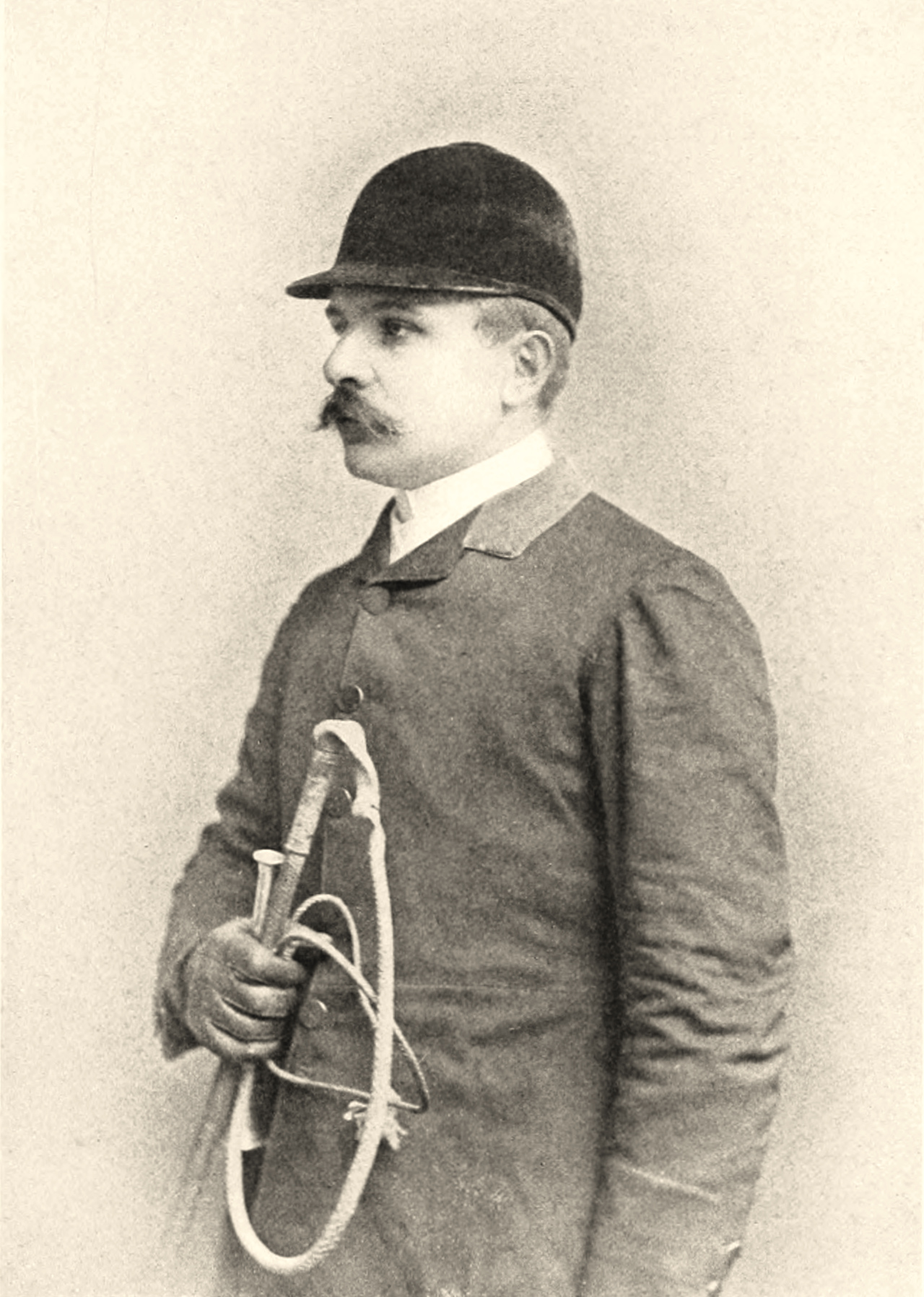

Personal information
- Born: 23 November 1860 Old Westbury, New York, U.S.
- Died: 29 September 1941 (aged 80) Old Westbury, New York, U.S.
- Occupations: Polo player; Trainer
- Spouse: Louise Mary Eustis (m. 1891; died 1934)
- Children: 4, including Thomas Jr.

Horse racing career
- Sport: Horse racing

Major racing wins
- Adirondack Stakes (1906); Saratoga Special Stakes (1906); American Grand National Steeplechase (1906, 1938)

Honors
- National Museum of Racing and Hall of Fame (1973); Museum of Polo and Hall of Fame (2002)

Significant horses
- Salvidere, Good and Plenty, Annibal

Thomas Hitchcock (23 November, 1860 – 29 September, 1941) was one of the leading American polo players during the latter part of the 19th century and a Hall of Fame horse trainer and owner known as the father of American steeplechase horse racing.

== Early life ==
He was born on 23 November 1860 in Westbury, New York, to Thomas Hitchcock (1831 – 1910) and Marie Louise Center (1829 – 1913), the daughter of a New York merchant. His father had been involved in the newspaper business with Charles Anderson Dana. He was educated at Brasenose College, Oxford, where he won a blue for polo in 1883, playing in the University polo team alongside his friend, Douglas Haig, 1st Earl Haig, later Field Marshal Earl Haig. He graduated in 1884.

His brothers were Center Hitchcock (1856 – 1909) and Francis R. Hitchcock (1858 – 1926), who was a thoroughbred owner/breeder in both the United States and in France and was a member of the Board of Stewards of The Jockey Club for thirty-one years. His brother left the bulk of his estate to Thomas.

== Career ==
Hitchcock was a key figure in developing the sport of polo in the United States. In 1877, he and his friend August Belmont Jr. were part of the group that organized the first polo match on Long Island, New York, played on the infield of the racetrack at the Mineola, New York, Fair Grounds. One of the first 10-goal players in the U.S., Hitchcock's efforts resulted in the 1881 formation of Long Island's Meadowbrook Polo Club. In 1886, he was a member of the United States team in the first international polo match that played for the Westchester Cup. A polo player herself, and the founder in the year 1916 of the Aiken Preparatory School, Louise Eustis Hitchcock had her sons playing polo as soon as they were old enough to swing a mallet. She also helped family friend Cornelius Vanderbilt Whitney to learn the game. Son Tommy Jr. would become a polo player who is considered by many expert observers as the greatest to have ever played the game.

Thomas Hitchcock and his wife spent virtually every winter at their 3,000-acre (12 km^{2}) estate in Aiken, South Carolina, where in 1892 he founded the Palmetto Golf Club. At that time, the city served as a winter playground for many of the country's wealthiest families such as the Vanderbilts and the Whitneys. The Hitchcocks built a steeplechase training track on their Aiken property and trained young thoroughbred horses imported from England. Fond of fox hunting, they also established the Aiken Hounds and, in 1916, received official recognition from the Masters of Foxhounds Association of North America. As an owner and trainer of racehorses, in 1895, Thomas Hitchcock began a career that would last for 47 years until his death in 1941. In flat racing, his colt Salvidere earned American Champion Two-Year-Old Colt honors. However, he had even greater success in steeplechasing. He was the owner or trainer of a number of top horses, including the Hall of Fame gelding Good and Plenty with whom he won the 1906 American Grand National.

== Personal life ==
On 28 August 1891, he married Louise Mary Eustis (1867 – 1934) of Washington, D.C., the daughter of George Eustis Jr. (1828 –1872) and Louise Corcoran Eustis (1838 – 1867), and the niece of Ambassador James B. Eustis. Louise was the only granddaughter of William Wilson Corcoran (1798 –1888), founder of the Corcoran Gallery of Art and co-founder of the Riggs Bank, and a granddaughter of George Eustis Sr. (1796 –1858) was Chief Justice of the Louisiana Supreme Court. Together, they had two sons and two daughters:

- Celestine Eustis Hitchcock (1892 – 1935), who married New York City architect Julian Livingston Peabody (1881–1935), son of Charles A. Peabody Jr., and died with him in the marine disaster, the sinking of the SS Mohawk off the coast of New Jersey in January 1935.
- Thomas Hitchcock Jr. (1900 – 1944), who was married Margaret Mellon (1901 – 1998), daughter of William Larimer Mellon Sr., in 1928.
- Francis Center Eustis Hitchcock, who married Mary Atwell in 1930. They divorced in 1934, and she later married William Mairs Duryea in 1935.
- Helen Hitchcock (d. 1979), who married James Averell Clark (1895 – 1960), son of George Crawford Clark, a founder of Clark, Dodge & Co., in 1919.

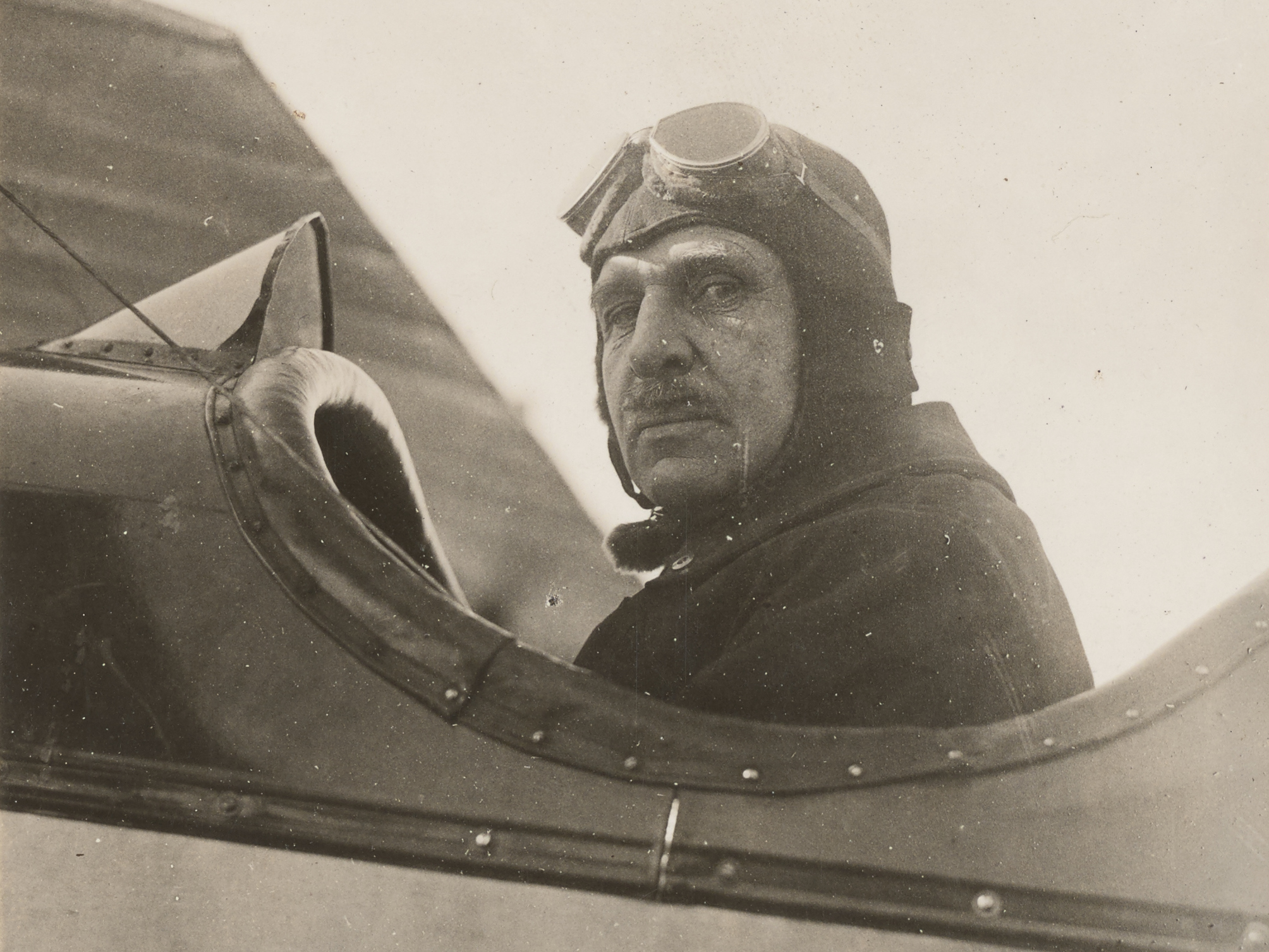
Capt. Hitchcock during World War I

During World War I, Hitchcock was commissioned a captain, Aviation Section, U.S. Signal Corps, on 6 August 1917. He was then made Commanding Officer, 15th Aero Squadron, at Hazelhurst Field, and subsequently became Acting Commanding Officer there. He was later transferred to nearby Roosevelt Field, where he was appointed wing flight commander. He was made a reserve military aviator on16 October 1917, and was promoted to a major, Signal Corps (Aviation Section), on 19 February 1918. He was on duty at Roosevelt Field at the time of his discharge on 26 December 1918.

Hitchcock died at his home, Broad Hollow Farm, in Old Westbury, Long Island, on 29 September 1941.

=== Legacy ===
Following its formation in 1973, Thomas Hitchcock was inducted posthumously in the National Museum of Racing and Hall of Fame and in 2002 into the Museum of Polo and Hall of Fame.
