= Hickerson =

Hickerson is an English surname. Notable people with the surname include:

- Bryan Hickerson (born 1963), American baseball player
- Gene Hickerson (1935–2008), American Football offensive guard
- Joe Hickerson (1935–2025), American folk singer, song finder, and musicologist
- John D. Hickerson (1898–1989), United States diplomat
