= Hans von Herwarth =

German diplomat

Hans-Heinrich Herwarth von Bittenfeld
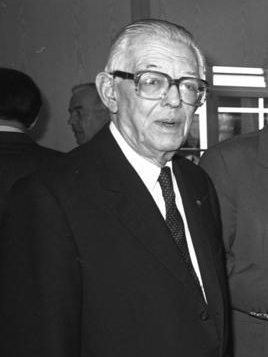
- Born: 14 July 1904; Berlin, Kingdom of Prussia, German Empire
- Died: 4 March 1999 (aged 94)

Hans-Heinrich Herwarth von Bittenfeld (14 July 1904 – 21 August 1999), also known as Johnnie or Johann von Herwarth, was a German diplomat who provided the Allies with information prior to and during the Second World War.

== Biography ==
Herwarth was born in Berlin. His paternal grandmother, Julia von Herwarth (née Haber), was Jewish. He graduated from high school in Berlin. He studied law and economics in Berlin, Breslau and Munich.

In 1927, he entered the German Foreign Office (Auswaertiges Amt) and was first stationed in Paris. He was stationed in Moscow 1931–1939, where he met George F. Kennan, Charles W. Thayer and Charles E. Bohlen. Fitzroy Maclean, then a young diplomat in the British Embassy, states in his memoir Eastern Approaches that Herwarth condemned the appeasement of the Munich Agreement, predicted a Soviet–German commitment to non-aggression (which came to pass as the Molotov–Ribbentrop Pact), and saw ahead to what he called "the destruction of Germany".

After 1939, he worked at the German Army Headquarters (OKW), in the Abwehr department.

From 1945 onward, Herwarth worked for the new German government, first in Munich, then in Bonn. In 1955, he became the first post-war German ambassador in London. In 1961, he was head of Bundespräsidialamt (the office of the Federal President); later he became ambassador to Rome. From 1971–1977 he was president of the Goethe-Institut, responsible for cultural relations.

Herwarth, who by marriage was a cousin of Claus von Stauffenberg, belonged to the aristocratic opposition against the Nazi regime. Maclean, who thought of him as an old friend, assessed him as "a patriotic German ... strongly and genuinely anti-Nazi".

== Herwarth and his contacts ==
In his memoirs (Witness to History, 1973), former U.S. ambassador to Germany Charles E. Bohlen reveals how, on the morning of 24 August 1939, he visited Herwarth at the German embassy and received the full content of the secret protocol to the Molotov–Ribbentrop Pact, signed the day before. The secret protocol contained an understanding between Adolf Hitler and Joseph Stalin on how to split Central Europe, the Baltic states and Finland between the two powers. President Franklin D. Roosevelt was urgently informed, but the United States did not pass this information to any concerned governments in Europe. A week later the plan was realised with the German invasion of Poland and the Second World War began.

According to the website of the German embassy in London, Herwarth and his superior, Ambassador von der Schulenburg, had already been trying since before the Munich Agreement to persuade Britain, France and the United States not to give in to Hitler's territorial demands.

Hans von Herwarth was the chief contact from the German embassy in Moscow to the western powers. Through him, the British were continuously informed on the progress of Soviet–German contacts during 1939. Von Herwarth is also held to be one of the German officials who informed the Allies on the decision to launch Operation Barbarossa in 1941, and to have given some of the earliest accounts of atrocities against Jews and other civilians behind the Eastern Front and in the Holocaust. It's not known how much his Soviet counterparts were informed.

Herwath was one of the leading players in the Konigswinter conference that was organised by Lilo Milchsack that healed the bad memories after the end of the Second World War. He worked with the ex soldier Fridolin von Senger und Etterlin, future German President Richard von Weizsäcker and other leading German decision makers as well as leading British politicians like Denis Healey, Richard Crossman and the journalist Robin Day.

In June 1989, Hans von Herwarth met the Latvian historian and member of the Soviet parliament, Mavriks Vulfsons, during the latter's visit to West Germany. Vulfsons was the first person in the USSR to publicly confirm the authenticity of the secret protocols to the German–Soviet pact of 1939 dividing Eastern Europe into "spheres of influence", a copy of which he obtained in the archives of the German Foreign Office.

== Bibliography ==
- Johnnie Herwarth von Bittenfeld and S. Frederick Starr: Against Two Evils: Memoirs of a Diplomat-Soldier during the Third Reich. London: Collins, 1981 and New York: Rawson, Wade, 1981 ISBN 978-0-89256-154-4 ISBN 0892561548; his autobiography
- Vulfsons, Mavriks: Baltic Fates: With a View on WW2. 100 Days That Destroyed the Peace, Riga-Hamburg-Rostock-London: SIA BOTA, 2002. ISBN 9984-19-354-3
