= United States Post Office (Mineola, New York) =

- U.S. Post Office
- U.S. National Register of Historic Places
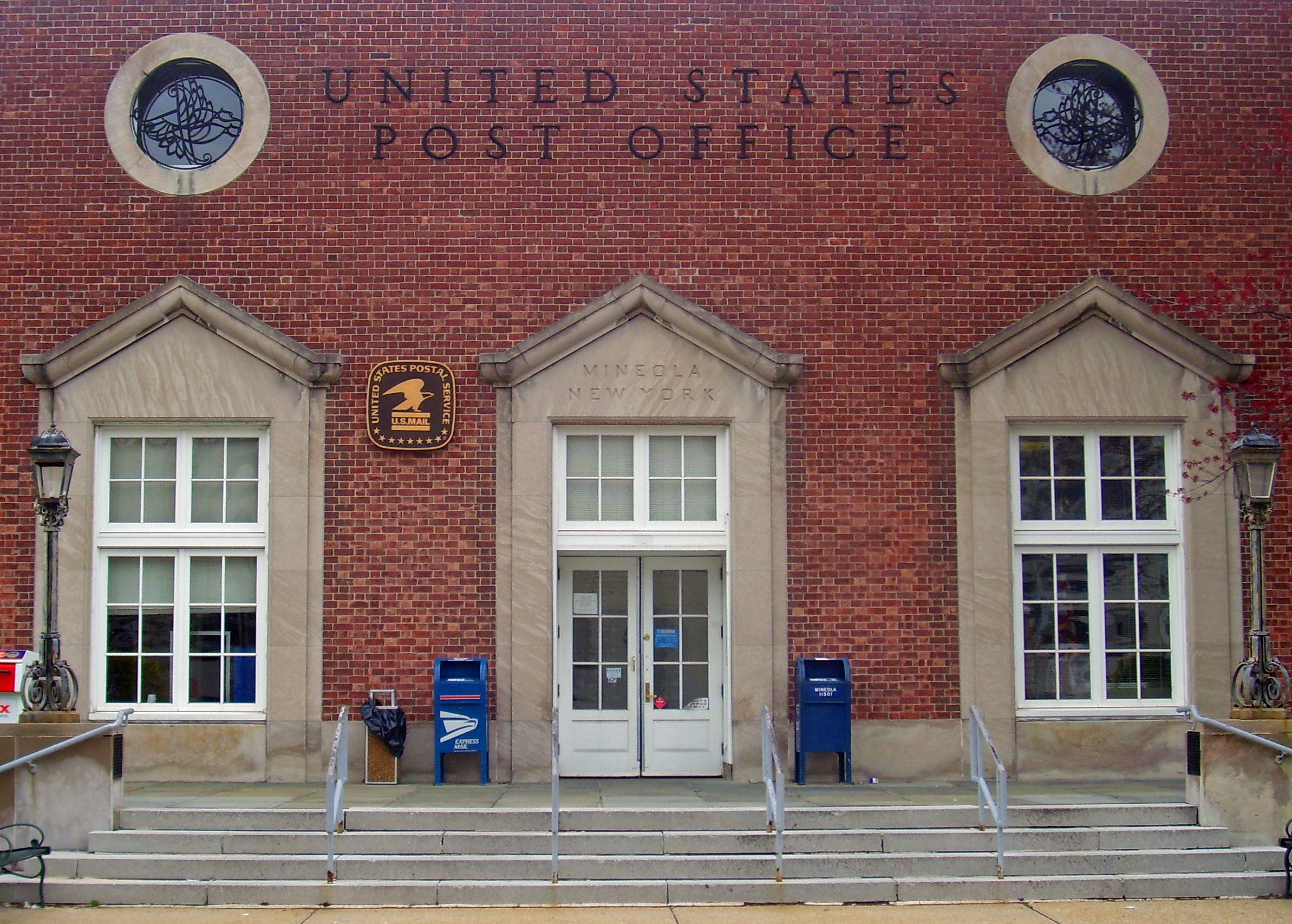
- Front entrance of post office and portion of facade, 2008

- Location within New York Location within the United States
- Location: Mineola, NY
- Nearest city: New York City
- Coordinates: 40°44′34″N 73°38′19″W
- Built: 1936
- Architect: Peabody, Wilson & Brown
- Architectural style: Colonial Revival
- MPS: US Post Offices in New York State, 1858-1943, TR
- NRHP reference No.: 88002354
- Added to NRHP: 1989

The U.S. Post Office in Mineola, New York serves the ZIP Code 11501, covering that community in the Towns of North Hempstead and Hempstead, New York, United States, the seat of Long Island's Nassau County. It is located on the northeast corner of the junction of First and Main Streets.

It is a brick building in the Colonial Revival architectural style built in 1936 as part of a massive Depression-era public works project that built many new post offices all over New York. Unusually among New York post offices in that style from that time, it was built in a rough hexagonal shape so that its main entrance could face southwest, towards the corner. It was also one of the last works of the firm of Peabody, Wilson & Brown. For these reasons it was added to the National Register of Historic Places in 1989, the only property in Mineola listed so far.

== History ==
The unincorporated community Mineola was already a central community of a primarily agricultural area when it was chosen as the seat of the newly formed county in 1899. In the early decades of the next century, improvements to rail and road transport led to the beginning of suburbanization in Nassau County and the Mineola area. The growth required, among many other things, new postal facilities.

In 1931 an amendment to the Public Buildings Act of 1926 authorized the construction of 136 new post offices in New York. Sixteen of these were to be in Long Island, including Mineola. The site was purchased in 1933, and Peabody, Wilson & Brown, a New York firm best known for some large estates on Long Island such as Charles Millard Pratt's Seamoor in Glen Cove and the Huntington Town Hall. A.J. Paretta Contracting of Long Island City began work in 1935, finishing the following year.

The Mineola post office is the only federal commission the Peabody Wilson firm is known to have undertaken, and one of its last. Julian Livingston Peabody and his wife drowned in January 1935 in the sinking of the passenger liner SS Mohawk off New Jersey, and Archibald Manning Brown left the firm that same year to head the design team planning the Harlem River Houses, the first federally financed housing project in New York City.

== Architecture ==
All six sides of the two-story steel frame building are faced in brick laid in Flemish bond. The entrance terrace is granite, paved with bluestone and using limestone coping, flanked with iron lampposts. The middle three of the five bays are recessed to allow for the limestone enframements around the double doors. Each window bay is topped by a roundel and bronze grille in an abstract eagle form. "United States Post Office" is spelled out by bronze letters between the roundels, and "Mineola, New York" is carved into the frieze above the main entrance. The entire structure is topped by limestone coping and a flat roof.

The interior retains the original pink Tennessee marble wainscoting with a dark marble baseboard. The walls above the marble are plaster with a molded cornice between them and the ceiling. The floor is terrazzo with embedded brass strips dividing it into areas of different color. Unusually for a post office of this size built during the 1930s, there is no mural or other artwork of the type commissioned by the Works Progress Administration in the lobby.

== Aesthetic ==
The Colonial Revival style had been popular for new post offices in New York from 1905 on, when the Geneva post office in the Finger Lakes region became the first in the state to use it. It was heavily used in the 1920s and later on in the 1930s, when new construction intensified as the government tried to alleviate the effects of the Great Depression. With a few exceptions, elements of Colonial buildings were used without trying to emulate any specific building. Aspects of the Mineola post office that most strongly reflect this are its entrance enframements, pediments, roundels and windows.

The 1930s also saw the emergence of the Art Deco and associated modernist styles. These made their mark on the Mineola post office in its flat roof, broad limestone decoration and the absence of cornices at the roof line. The abstracted eagle shapes in the roundel grilles are also another touch more in keeping with modernism than Colonial Revival.
