= George Newell Armsby =

American entrepreneur

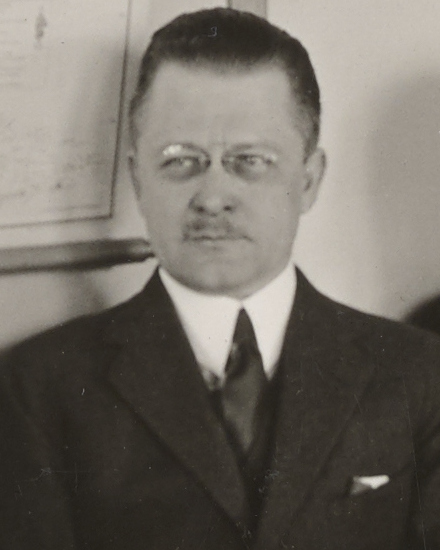
- Armsby in March 1918
- Born: August 10, 1876; Evanston, Illinois, United States
- Died: October 25, 1942 (aged 66); Manhattan, New York City, United States
- Occupations: Entrepreneur, business executive
- Parent: James K. Armsby

George Newell Armsby (August 10, 1876 – October 25, 1942) was an American entrepreneur who led major corporate mergers in the first half of the 20th century, including the merger of California food companies that resulted in California Packing Corporation, which sold under the Del Monte and Sunkist labels.

Armsby was on the board of Curtiss-Wright, where he was chairman, Universal Pictures, Bancamerica-Blair, and others. He was associated with John Cheever Cowdin with whom he ran Universal Pictures; they were also both involved in the formation of Transcontinental Air Transport, which was later a foundation of TWA.

== Early life ==
Armsby was born in Evanston, Illinois, on August 10, 1876, a son of food-packing entrepreneur James K. Armsby. His younger sister was golfer Cornelia Wicker Armsby. He went to work for his father's concern, J.K. Armsby Co., and on December 28, 1898, he married Leonora Wood, daughter of Colorado mining entrepreneur Tingley Sylvanus Wood.

== Career ==
=== California Packing Corporation ===
In the mid-1910s he conceived a plan to unite California's food-packing companies under a single association, and he went to New York to secure the $16,000,000 in financing necessary to do it. Blair & Co. and William Salomon & Co. lent him the funds, and California Packing Corporation was founded.

=== Blair-Salomon ===
After serving on the Priorities Commission of the War Industries Board during World War I, he persuaded his two lenders on the CalPack deal to merge and he went to work for the new concern, Blair & Co., Inc. In time, the new enterprise was bought by Transamerica, and Armsby found himself working under his friend and fellow fruit-grower Amadeo Giannini. In time, this link would prove crucial to Armsby's next venture.

=== Bank of America-Blair ===
After playing a role in the construction of 40 Wall Street, for a time the world's tallest building and now The Trump Building, Armsby and Cowdin persuaded Amadeo Giannini's Bank of America to merge with Blair, which in 1931, in the depths of the Great Depression, a major force on Wall Street.

=== McKesson and Robbins ===
In January 1940, Armsby headed the committee representing the $3 cumulative preference stock class of McKesson and Robbins scandal, asking views on the development of a reorganization plan.

Armsby's business life showed no sign of slowdown as he went into the 1940s. He remained involved with Curtiss-Wright and Universal Pictures, and was a defendant in an anti-trust case against the movie industry in the late 1930s.

== Personal life ==
As his business ventures soared, Armsby's personal life was no less colorful. His marriage to Leonora disintegrated, and in March 1929 she sued for and was granted a divorce in San Francisco, alleging, as was common at the time with unhappy spouses, that Armsby had abandoned her in New York City, in 1924. The subsequent divorce settlement of $1,000,000 made the papers as far away as Helena, Montana. Notably, Leonora retained the Armsby name until her death in 1962.

Armsby's personal life made the papers next year when, in March 1930, he announced that he was marrying, at age 54, a 36-year-old woman, Colette Touzeau, whom The New York Times and other papers reported was an ex-showgirl. They married that month in Los Angeles, and remained together until Armsby's death 12 years later.

== Death ==
On October 25, 1942, Armsby died at Mount Sinai Hospital in Manhattan, at age 66.

== Sources ==
- "Matron of Society Sheds Her Hubby". The Helena Independent, March 3, 1929.
- "Armsby Weds Wednesday". The New York Times, March 23, 1930, page N7.
- "Business & Finance: Transamerica Unscrambled". Time. October 5, 1931.
- "Business & Finance: Peaches, Prunes & Bonds". Time. March 28, 1932.
- Obituary, The New York Times, September 26, 1942.
- Obituary, The New York Times, September 27, 1942.
