= John D. Hickerson =

American diplomat (1898–1989)

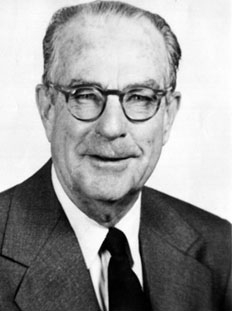

United States Ambassador to the Philippines
- In office January 13, 1960 – December 8, 1961
- President: Dwight D. Eisenhower
- Preceded by: Charles E. Bohlen
- Succeeded by: William E. Stevenson

United States Ambassador to Finland
- In office November 23, 1955 – November 3, 1959
- President: Dwight D. Eisenhower
- Preceded by: Jack K. McFall
- Succeeded by: Edson O. Sessions

2nd Assistant Secretary of State for International Organization Affairs
- In office August 8, 1949 – July 27, 1953
- President: Harry S. Truman; Dwight D. Eisenhower
- Preceded by: Dean Rusk
- Succeeded by: Robert D. Murphy

Personal details
- Born: John Dewey Hickerson; January 26, 1898 Crawford, Texas, U.S.
- Died: January 18, 1989 (aged 90) Washington, D.C., U.S.
- Spouse: Vida Corbin Hickerson (m. 1923)
- Children: 1
- Education: University of Texas at Austin

John Dewey Hickerson (January 26, 1898 – January 18, 1989) was a 20th Century American diplomat.

== Biography ==
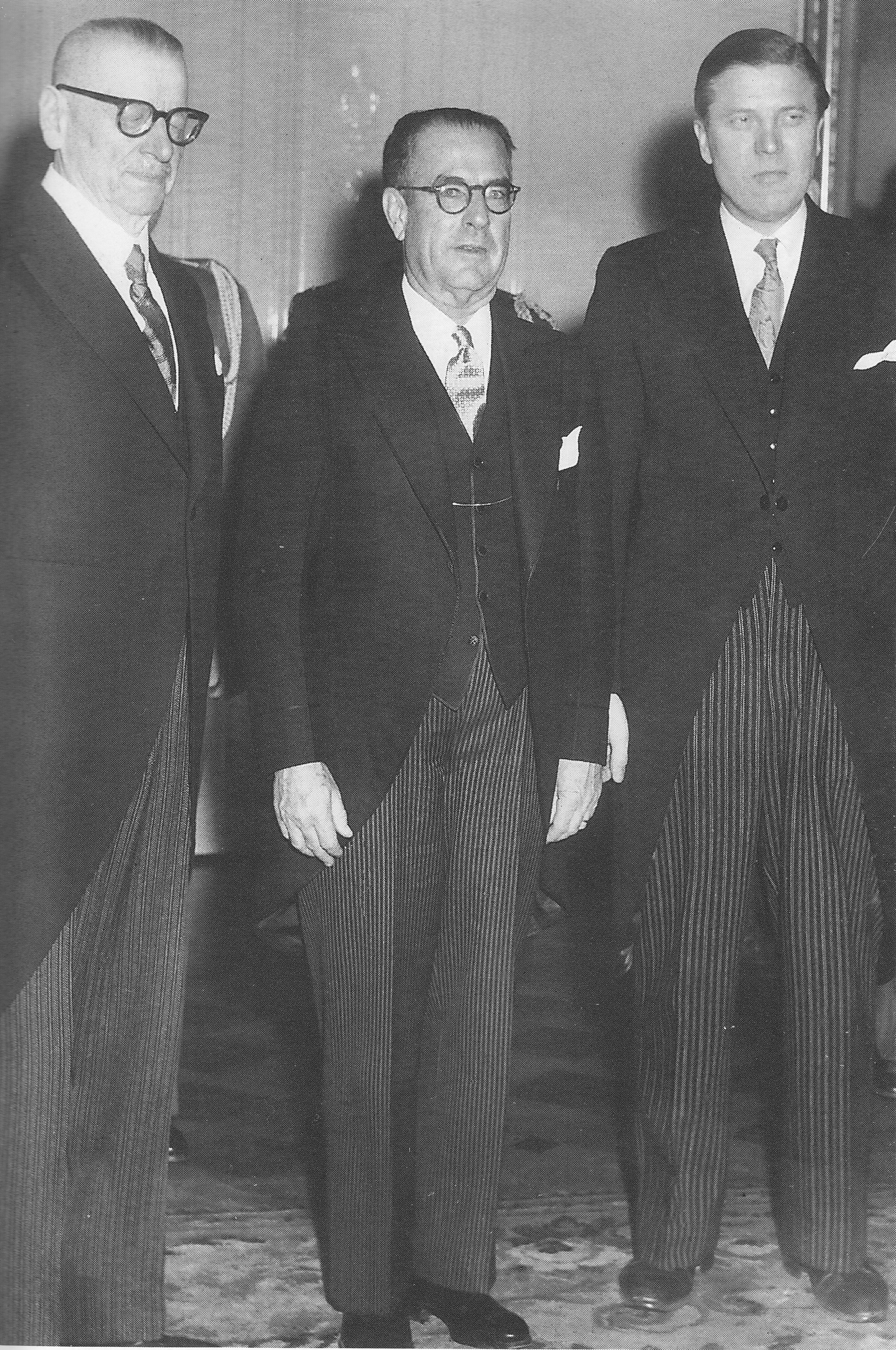
From left to right: Finnish President J. K. Paasikivi, Hickerson and Finnish Foreign Minister Johannes Virolainen in 1955.

John D. Hickerson was born at Crawford, Texas, on January 26, 1898. He was educated at the University of Texas at Austin, receiving a B.A. in 1920.

After college, Hickerson joined the United States Foreign Service. He was a vice consul in Tampico, Tamaulipas from 1920 to 1922, then in Rio de Janeiro from 1922 to 1924. He was then promoted to consul and served in that capacity at Pará in 1924–25 and at Ottawa 1925–27. He moved to Washington, D.C., in 1928, becoming Assistant Chief of the United States Department of State's Division of West European Affairs, a position he held until 1940. He also sat on the State Department's Board of Appeals & Review from 1934 until 1941.

In 1940, Hickerson became secretary of the American section of the newly formed Permanent Joint Board on Defense. He held this position for the duration of World War II. He also served as Chief of the State Department's Division of British Commonwealth Affairs in 1944, and from 1944 to 1947 was Deputy Director of the Office of European Affairs. In this capacity, he was an adviser to the U.S. delegation to the Dumbarton Oaks Conference and to the United Nations Conference on International Organization. In 1947, he was promoted to Director of the Office of European Affairs. Along with Theodore Achilles, Hickerson was one of the primary authors of the text of the North Atlantic Treaty, which established the North Atlantic Treaty Organization, during 1948–1949. Hickerson later provided an extensive oral account of those developments.

In 1949, President of the United States Harry Truman nominated Hickerson as Assistant Secretary of State for International Organization Affairs, and Hickerson held this office from June 24, 1949 until July 27, 1953. He then spent the next two years as a faculty adviser at the National War College.

President Dwight D. Eisenhower named Hickerson United States Ambassador to Finland in 1955; Hickerson presented his credentials on November 23, 1955, and left this post on November 3, 1959. Eisenhower then appointed Hickerson as United States Ambassador to the Philippines, and Hickerson held this post from January 13, 1960, until December 8, 1961.

Hickerson was a regular lecturer at the School of Foreign Service of Georgetown University and served on the board of directors of the Atlantic Council.

In retirement, Hickerson lived in Washington, D.C. His wife, Vida Corbin Hickerson, died in June 1988. He died of cancer on January 18, 1989. Survivors includes his son, John H. Hickerson, three grandchildren, and two great-grandchildren.

Government offices
Preceded by Dean Rusk	Assistant Secretary of State for International Organization Affairs; August 8, 1949 – July 27, 1953	Succeeded by Robert Daniel Murphy
Diplomatic posts
Preceded by Jack K. McFall	United States Ambassador to Finland; November 23, 1955 – November 3, 1959	Succeeded by Edson O. Sessions
Preceded by Charles E. Bohlen	United States Ambassador to the Philippines; January 13, 1960 – December 8, 1961	Succeeded by William E. Stevenson
