= Good and Plenty =

American Thoroughbred racehorse

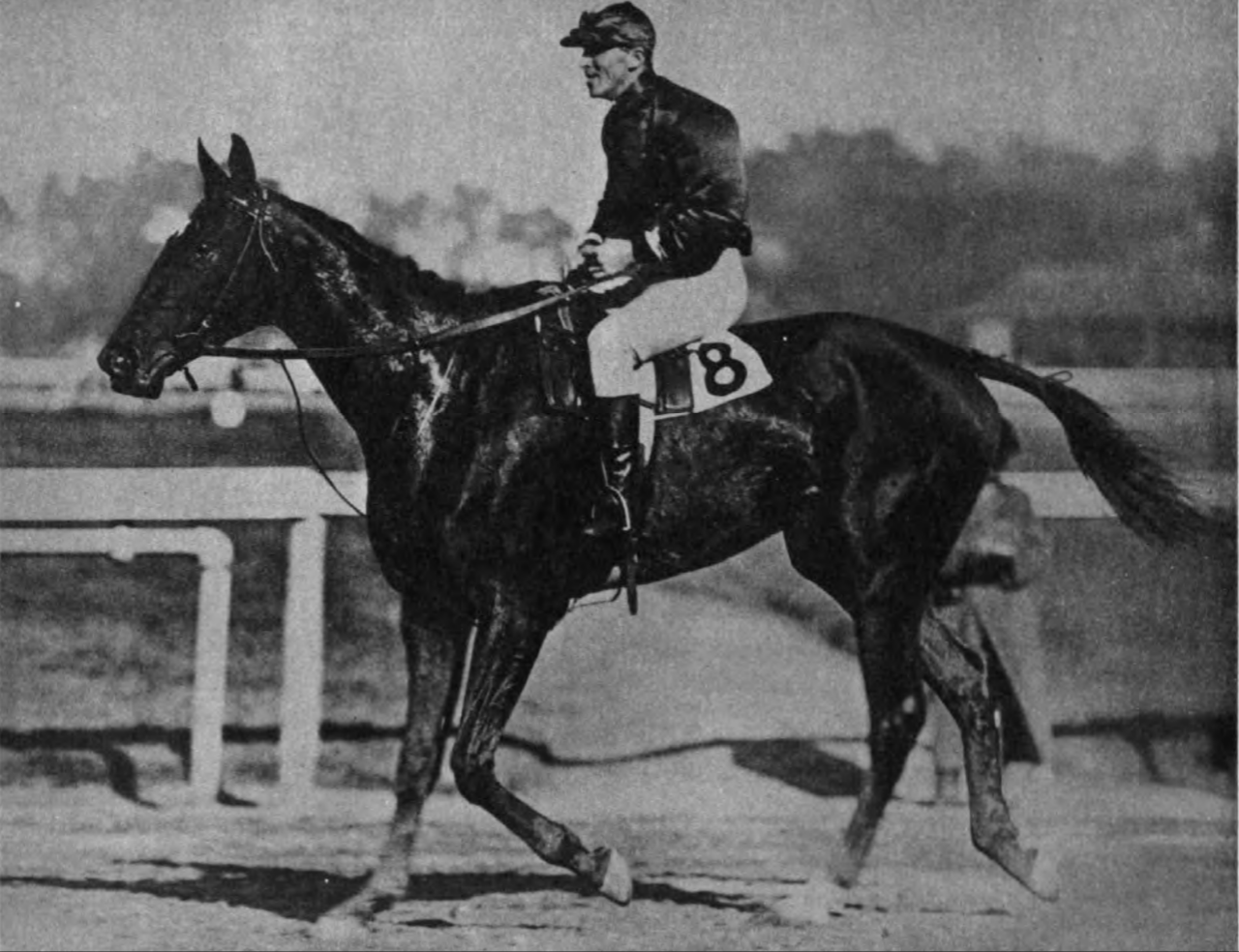
- Good and Plenty
- Sire: Rossington
- Grandsire: Doncaster
- Dam: Famine
- Damsire: Jils Johnson
- Sex: Gelding
- Foaled: 1900
- Country: United States
- Colour: Bay
- Breeder: Frank B. Harper
- Owner: Thomas Hitchcock
- Trainer: Charles Kiernan
- Record: 21: 14-4-1
- Earnings: $45,815

Major wins
- Champion Steeplechase Handicap (1904); American Grand National Steeplechase (1906)

Honours
- United States Racing Hall of Fame inductee (1956)

Good and Plenty (1900–1907) was an American steeplechase racehorse.

== History ==
Trained by Charles Kiernan, the bay gelding raced for four years between 1904 and 1907, leading all steeplechase horses in earnings and finishing with a record of 14-4-1 in 21 races that included a victory in the 1906 American Grand National Steeplechase.

Good and Plenty died of a chronic bone disease in 1907. He was inducted into the National Museum of Racing and Hall of Fame in 1956. There is a photo and painting on the Racing museum website.

Total winnings $45,815, or over $1.2 million in 2016 dollars. In 1904 he won 7 consecutive races. Races won include the NY Steeplechase, the Belmont Whitney Memorial, the Westbury, the Grand National and the Champion Handicap. For the period 1904 to 1907 was the most successful horse of his time. 1904 he won 8 races and earned 17,000. 1905 won 2 races and won $11,000. 1906 he won 3 out 4 races and won $14,000 and 1907 won 1 races and earned $2,600.

Charles Cary Rumsey, an American sculptor and polo playing friend, was commissioned by Tommy Hitchcock to create a sculpture of Good and Plenty.
