= USAHS Algonquin =

Ocean liner (1926–1957)

History
- Name: Algonquin
- Owner: Clyde-Mallory Line (1926–1940); Porto Rico Line (1941–1942); United States Army (1942–1957)
- Operator: Clyde-Mallory Line (1926–1940); Puerto Rico Line (1941–1942); United States Army (1942–1946)
- Port of registry: (United States) New York (1926–1942); (United States) Charleston (1942–1945); (United States) New York (1945–1957)
- Builder: Newport News Shipbuilding & Dry Dock Co
- Yard number: 317
- Launched: 9 September 1926
- Completed: December 1926
- Identification: US Official Number 226126; Code Letters MGJF (1926–1933); Code Letters KGDL (1934–1946)
- Fate: Sold for scrap, 1957

General characteristics
- Tonnage: 5,946 GRT
- Length: 317 ft 5 in (96.75 m)
- Beam: 55 ft (16.76 m)
- Draught: 20 ft (6.10 m)
- Propulsion: Two steam turbines driving a single screw
- Speed: 15 knots (28 km/h)

Algonquin was an ocean liner built in 1926 for the Clyde-Mallory Line. She was involved in a collision in 1929 and rescued survivors from another in 1935. Repaired after a fire in 1940, she was requisitioned for use as a troopship and later a hospital ship. She served until 1946 when she was laid up, finally being scrapped in 1957.

== History ==
Algonquin was built by Newport News Shipbuilding and Drydock Company, Newport News, Virginia. She was yard number 317 and was launched on 9 September 1926 and completed in December that year. Algonquin was built for the Clyde Mallory Line and her port of registry was New York.

On 18 December 1929, Algonquin was in collision with RMS Fort Victoria in the Ambrose Channel, off New York in thick fog. Fort Victoria was hit on the port side by the bows of Algonquin, which was on a voyage from Galveston, Texas to New York. Both ships issued distress calls and all on board Fort Victoria were rescued before that ship sank.

On 24 January 1935, the SS Mohawk was involved in a collision with the SS Talisman after her automatic steering gear failed. Mohawk sank within an hour. Algonquin and SS Limon rescued 107 survivors between them but 46 people were killed.

In July 1940, Algonquin caught fire and sank while docked at New York. The ship was salvaged and repaired, then transferred to the Puerto Rico Line on return to service in 1941. In January 1942, she was requisitioned and put into service as a troopship. Her port of registry was changed to Charleston, South Carolina. In July 1943, Algonquin was requisitioned by the United States Army Transport Service. She was refitted by the Alabama Drydock and Shipbuilding Company, Mobile, Alabama and entered service at the end in January 1944. Her maiden voyage as a hospital ship was from New Orleans, Louisiana to Gibraltar, then Oran, Algeria and Bizerte, Tunisia ending in Naples, Italy. On her return to Charleston, she was sent to Merrill-Stevens Drydock & Repair Company, Jacksonville, Florida for repairs, spending most of April there.

In May 1944, Algonquin made another voyage to Gibraltar and Bizerte, returning at the end of the month. The following month, the trip was repeated, with an additional call at Naples. In July and August, Algonquin was operating between Bizerte and Naples. On 15 August, she was one of twelve hospital ships supporting Operation Dragoon, the Allied invasion of southern France. In mid-September Algonquin returned to Charleston, then departed for Oran on 22 September. She then spent some time operating between Livorno, Italy, Marseille, France, Naples and Oran, returning to Charleston on 22 February 1945. Between May and September, Algonquin made four return trips between the United States and Europe, with one arrival in New York harbor on 2 July. Her return voyage in September was to her new port of registry, New York. Two more return trips to Marseille and Naples were made and then Algonquin was drydocked in December for conversion to trooping duties again. On completion of the work in January 1946, she was employed to repatriate American troops and Italian war brides from Europe.

Algonquin was withdrawn from service in June 1946 and laid up in the James River. She was scrapped in 1957 at Baltimore, arriving on 10 January.

== Description ==
Algonquin was a 5,946 GRT ocean liner. She was 317 feet 5 inches (96.75 m) long, with a beam of 55 feet (16.76 m) and a draught of 20 feet (6.10 m). She was propelled by two steam turbines which drove a single propeller through single reduction gearing. The twin turbines could propel her at 15 knots (28 km/h).

== Official Numbers and Code Letters ==
Official Numbers were a forerunner to IMO Numbers. Algonquin had the US Official Number 226126 and the Code Letters MGJF. In 1934, her Code Letters were changed to KGDL.
