= George Eustis Sr. =

American judge (1796– 1858)

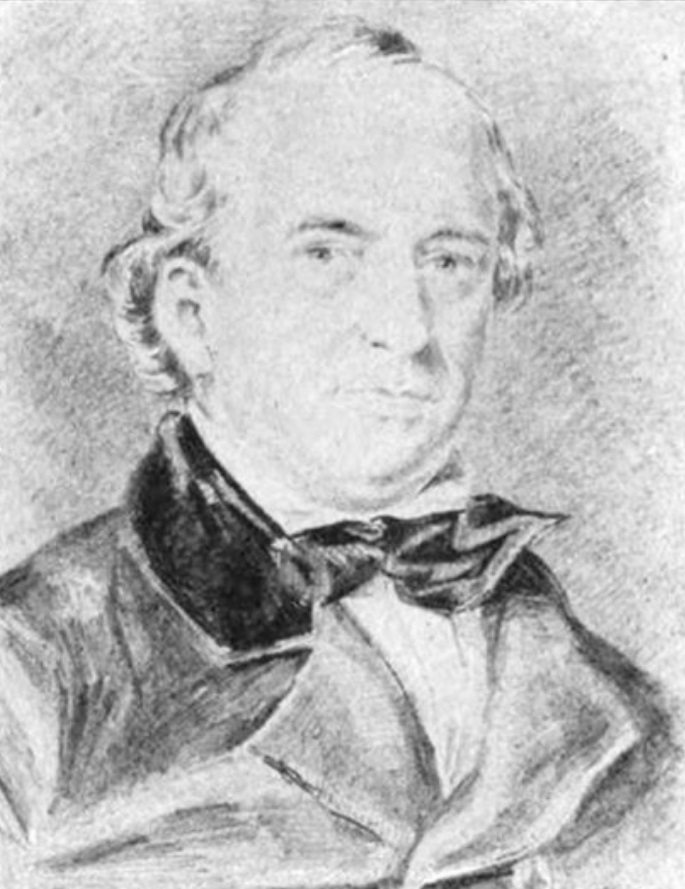

Secretary of State of Louisiana
- In office 1832–1834
- Governor: Andre B. Roman
- Preceded by: George A. Waggaman
- Succeeded by: Martin Blache

Attorney General of Louisiana
- In office 1830–1832
- Governor: Jacques Dupré; Andre B. Roman
- Preceded by: Alonzo Morphy
- Succeeded by: Etienne Mazureau

Personal details
- Born: 20 October 1796 Boston, Massachusetts, U.S.
- Died: 22 December 1858 (aged 62) New Orleans, Louisiana, U.S.
- Resting place: First Church in Jamaica Plain Cemetery, Jamaica Plain, Massachusetts; 42.30976°N 71.11594°W
- Party: Whig
- Spouse: Clarisse Allain (m. 1825)
- Relations: William Eustis (uncle)
- Children: 6, including George Jr., James
- Parent(s): Jacob Eustis; Elizabeth Saunders Gray
- Education: Harvard College (1815)
- Known for: First Justice of the Supreme Court of Louisiana

George Eustis Sr. (October 20, 1796 – December 22, 1858) was chief justice of the Louisiana Supreme Court in 1838. He was also one of the founders of the Pontchartrain Railroad and a benefactor of the University of Louisiana, now Tulane University.

== Early life ==
George Eustis was born in Boston on October 20, 1796, to Jacob Eustis and Elizabeth Saunders Gray. He attended and graduated from Harvard University in 1815.

== Career ==
In 1815, he was appointed as private secretary to his uncle, William Eustis, who was then serving as Minister to the Netherlands. Having begun studying law while in the Netherlands, Eustis settled in New Orleans, Louisiana, in 1817, completed his studies, and was admitted to the bar.

A Whig, Eustis served three terms in the Louisiana House of Representatives in the 1820s. He was Louisiana Attorney General from 1830 to 1832, and from 1832 to 1834 he was Secretary of State. As Secretary of State he helped establish Medical College of Louisiana, which received its charter in 1835.

From 1838 to 1839, Eustis was a justice of the Louisiana Supreme Court. He was a delegate to Louisiana's 1845 constitutional convention, where he secured approval for establishment of the University of Louisiana. The university received its charter in 1847, and he was ex officio president of the original board of trustees.

In 1846, Eustis became the first chief justice of Louisiana Supreme Court, and he served until the court was reorganized in 1852. In 1850, the last census of his life, his father owned 10 slaves in New Orleans, two of whom were classified as mulatto.

== Personal life ==
On April 18, 1825, Eustis married Clarisse Allain, the daughter of Valérien Allain and Céleste (née Duralde) Allain. She was the granddaughter of Martin Duralde of Aix-les-Bains and Attapakas, and of François Allain, a native of Brittany, France who emigrated to Louisiana after serving in the French Army in 1745 at the Battle of Fontenoy. Clarisse was the niece of Julie (née Duralde) Clay and John Clay, the brother of Henry Clay, and Marie Clarisse Duralde (1779–1809), who married William C. C. Claiborne (1773/5–1817), Governor of Louisiana. Her uncle, Martin Duralde Jr. (1785–1848) married Susan Hart Clay (1805–1825), the daughter of Henry Clay. They were the parents of:

- George Eustis Jr. (1828–1872), a member of the U.S. House of Representatives who married Louise Morris Corcoran (1838–1867), daughter of William Wilson Corcoran.
- Allain Eustis (1830–1936), who married Anais de Saint Manat (b. 1832)
- Marie Mathilde Eustis (b. 1831), who married, Charles E. Johnston of Allerton Hall, Liverpool, on September 11, 1856. Johnston's sister, Eliza Fanny (1836–1890), was married to Sir Edward Augustus Inglefield (1820–1894).
- John Gray Eustis (b. 1833)
- James Biddle Eustis (1834–1899), a United States senator and Ambassador to France who married Ellen Buckner (1836–1895).
- Celestine Eustis (1836–1921)

Chief Justice Eustis died in New Orleans on December 22, 1858. His remains were taken aboard the steamship Cahawba for the trip north so they could be interred in the family tomb in Jamaica Plain, Massachusetts, a fact noted by Richard Henry Dana Jr. author of the celebrated Two Years Before the Mast. Dana was traveling on the same vessel, as described in his 1859 work To Cuba and Back.

=== Descendants ===
His granddaughter, Louise Mary Eustis (1867–1934), was married to noted polo player Thomas Hitchcock Sr. (1860–1941).

His grandson through his son Allain, George Patrick Eustis (1860–1927), was the maternal grandfather of William Wayne McMillan Rogers III (1933–2015), better known as actor Wayne Rogers.

Legal offices
Preceded by Alonzo Morphy	Attorney General of Louisiana; 1830–1833	Succeeded by Etienne Mazureau
