= Julian Livingston Peabody =

American architect and soldier (1881–1935)

- Born: March 29, 1881; New York City, U.S.
- Died: January 24, 1935 (aged 53); New Jersey, U.S.
- Education: Harvard University; Columbia School of Architecture; École des Beaux-Arts
- Occupations: Architect, soldier
- Spouse: Celestine Eustis Hitchcock (m. 1913; their death 1935)
- Children: 3
- Parent(s): Charles A. Peabody Jr. Charlotte Damon Peabody

Julian Livingston Peabody (March 29, 1881 – January 24, 1935) was an American architect and soldier who drowned on board the SS Mohawk during a collision with a cargo ship.

== Early life and education ==
Peabody was born on March 29, 1881, in New York City. He was the eldest of three children born to Charlotte Anita Damon and politician Charles Augustus Peabody Jr.. He had two younger siblings, John Damon Peabody and Anita Livingston Peabody.

His paternal grandparents were Judge Charles A. Peabody and his first wife Julia Caroline (née Livingston) Peabody. His grandfather's second wife was Mary Eliza Hamilton, a cousin of Caroline Schermerhorb Astor, a daughter of John Church Hamilton, and granddaughter of Alexander Hamilton.

Peabody prepared at Groton School, graduating with the class of 1899, before attending Harvard University. After his 1903 graduation from Harvard, he spent a year at the Columbia School of Architecture before three years spent studying in France at the École nationale supérieure des Beaux-Arts, beginning in the spring of 1905, where he joined the atelier Deglane.

== Career ==
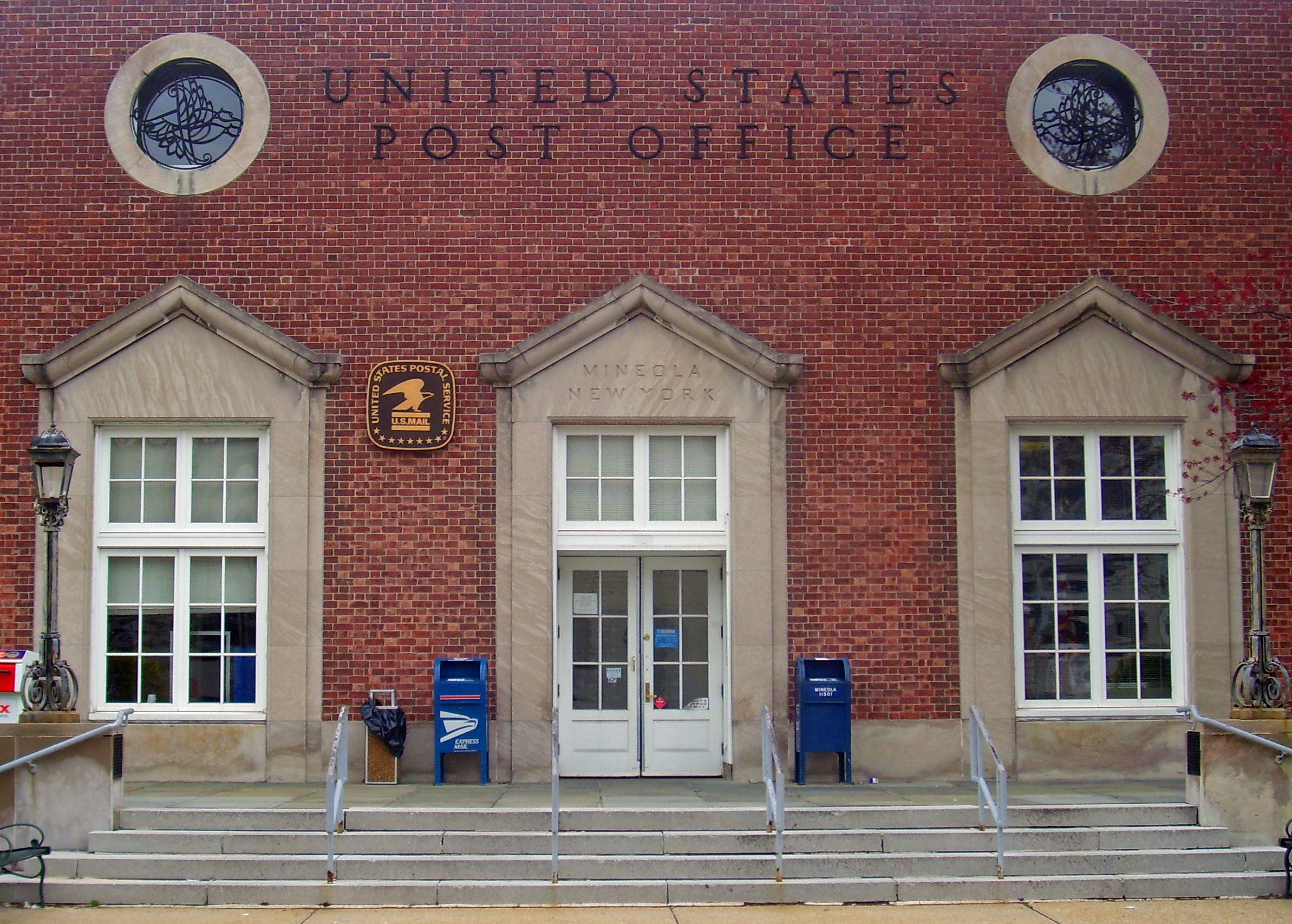
Front entrance of Mineola Post Office and portion of facade, 2008.

In 1907, Peabody returned to New York from Paris where he entered the office of Howells & Stokes (architects John Mead Howells and Isaac Newton Phelps Stokes), and later, the office of Grosvenor Atterbury, architect.

In January 1911, he established the architectural firm of Peabody, Wilson and Brown, with offices at 389 Fifth Avenue in New York City. His partners were Archibald Manning Brown, who studied with Peabody at the École des Beaux-Arts, and Albert E. Wilson. They later moved to 140 East 39th Street.

Peabody earned a reputation as being one of the foremost American architects for the design of large country houses, including the president's houses at Dartmouth College and Wake Forest University. The firm was responsible for the 1921 renovation of the Hotel Astor in Times Square as well as various schools and public buildings. He designed homes for Maxfield Parrish, Augustus St. Gaudens, and author James Norman Hall, a personal friend of the Peabodys, in Tahiti.

The United States Post Office in Mineola is the only federal commission the Peabody, Wilson firm is known to have undertaken, and was one of its last. After Peabody's death, Brown left the firm that same year to head the design team planning the Harlem River Houses, the first federally financed housing project in New York City.

=== Military service ===
During World War I, due to the ill health of his wife, he obtained a position in the Red Cross Headquarters in Washington, D.C., where he was quickly made director of the Bureau of Allied Prisoners' Relief. In the spring of 1918, after his wife's health recovered sufficiently for him to serve, he obtained a commission in the Aviation Division of the U.S. Navy for service in France as an Intelligence officer. After several months of preparation at Annapolis, he went to France in May 1918 and served there until the armistice.

== Personal life and death ==
On March 27, 1913, Peabody was married to Celestine Eustis Hitchcock in Aiken, South Carolina, by the Right Rev. Henry P. Northrop, Bishop of South Carolina. Celestine was a daughter of polo player Thomas Hitchcock Sr. and Louise Marie (née Eustis) Hitchcock. Together, they lived at Pond Hollow Farm in Westbury on Long Island (across the road from his parents-in-law's estate, Broad Hollow Farm), and were the parents of a son who died in infancy, and two surviving children:

- Julian Livingston Peabody Jr. (1914–2014), a graduate of Princeton University and Columbia Law School who was a lawyer with LeBoeuf, Lamb, Leiby,
- Daphne Peabody, who married Edward Eugene Murray, a Dartmouth College graduate who was the son of the Democratic Senator from Montana, James E. Murray, in 1944.

Peabody was a member of the Harvard Club, the Racquet and Tennis Club, the New York City Club, the Piping Rock Club, the Locus Valley Club, the Seawanhaka Yacht Club, the Oyster Bay Club, the Architectural League of New York and the Beaux Arts Society.

Peabody and his wife were traveling to Mexico on board the liner SS Mohawk (owned by the Clyde-Mallory Line and under charter to the Ward Line) when it was involved in a collision with the Norwegian cargo ship Talisman off the coast of New Jersey. Fifteen passengers, including the Peabodys, and thirty crew members died in the sinking. After a double funeral at the Church of the Resurrection at 119 East 74th Street, the Peabodys were buried at Westbury Friends Cemetery.
