= Charles E. Bohlen =

American diplomat (1904–1974)

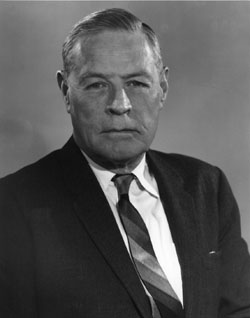

United States Ambassador to France
- In office October 27, 1962 – February 9, 1968
- President: John F. Kennedy; Lyndon B. Johnson
- Preceded by: James M. Gavin
- Succeeded by: Sargent Shriver

United States Ambassador to the Philippines
- In office June 4, 1957 – October 15, 1959
- President: Dwight D. Eisenhower
- Preceded by: Albert F. Nufer
- Succeeded by: John D. Hickerson

United States Ambassador to the Soviet Union
- In office April 20, 1953 – April 18, 1957
- President: Dwight D. Eisenhower
- Preceded by: George F. Kennan
- Succeeded by: Llewellyn E. Thompson

7th and 9th Counselor of the United States Department of State
- In office July 12, 1951 – March 29, 1953
- President: Dwight D. Eisenhower
- Preceded by: George F. Kennan
- Succeeded by: Douglas MacArthur II
- In office August 1, 1947 – August 3, 1949
- President: Harry S. Truman
- Preceded by: Benjamin Victor Cohen
- Succeeded by: George F. Kennan

Personal details
- Born: Charles Eustis Bohlen; August 30, 1904 Clayton, New York, U.S.
- Died: January 1, 1974 (aged 69) Washington, D.C., U.S.
- Resting place: Laurel Hill Cemetery; Philadelphia, Pennsylvania, U.S.
- Spouse: Avis Howard Thayer
- Children: 3, including Avis
- Education: Harvard University

Charles Eustis "Chip" Bohlen (August 30, 1904 – January 1, 1974) was an American diplomat, ambassador, and expert on the Soviet Union. He helped shape United States foreign policy during World War II and the Cold War and helped develop the Marshall Plan to rebuild Europe.

In 1934, Bohlen served as a diplomat in the first US embassy to the Soviet Union in Moscow as well as during and after World War II. He succeeded George F. Kennan as ambassador to the Soviet Union from 1953 to 1957. He served as ambassador to the Philippines from 1957 to 1959 and to France from 1962 to 1968. He was an advisor to every U.S. president from 1943 to 1968 and one of the nonpartisan foreign policy advisers who were known colloquially as "The Wise Men".

== Early life and education ==
Bohlen was born in Clayton, New York, on August 30, 1904, to Celestine Eustis Bohlen, the daughter of James B. Eustis, a senator from Louisiana and ambassador to France, and Charles Bohlen. His father had inherited a fortune and was a banker and sportsman. The second of three Bohlen children, Charles Eustis was raised in Aiken, South Carolina, and moved with his family at age 12 to Ipswich, Massachusetts. He graduated from St. Paul's School in Concord, New Hampshire. He acquired an interest in foreign countries by traveling in Europe as a boy. Bohlen graduated from Harvard College in 1927. He was a member of the Porcellian Club, where he gained the nickname "Chipper" which was later shortened to "Chip."

== Family ==
Bohlen's great-granduncle was American Civil War general Henry Bohlen, the first foreign-born Union general (from Germany) in the Civil War and the grandfather of Gustav Krupp von Bohlen und Halbach, who used the name Krupp after he had married Bertha Krupp, an heiress of the Krupp family of German weapon-makers. He was therefore distantly related to Alfried Krupp von Bohlen und Halbach, Germany's primary weapon-maker during World War II. Gustav Krupp von Bohlen und Halbach was indicted for war crimes at the Nuremberg tribunal, but illness prevented his prosecution until his demise in 1950.

In 1935, Bohlen married Avis Howard Thayer, born September 18, 1912, in Philadelphia, the daughter of George Thayer and Gertrude Wheeler. The Avis Bohlen Award was created and named for her in 1982. It is administered by the American Foreign Service Association and each year honors the US Foreign Service dependent who has done the most to advance US interests. Her brother, Charles W. Thayer, was also a diplomat and worked closely with his brother-in-law, Charles, as US vice-consul in Moscow. Charles and Avis Bohlen had two daughters, Avis and Celestine, and a son, Charles Jr. The daughter Avis also became a distinguished diplomat and served as deputy chief of mission in Paris, US ambassador to Bulgaria, and US assistant secretary of state for arms control. The other daughter, Celestine, became a journalist and has been a Moscow-based reporter for The New York Times.

== Diplomatic career ==
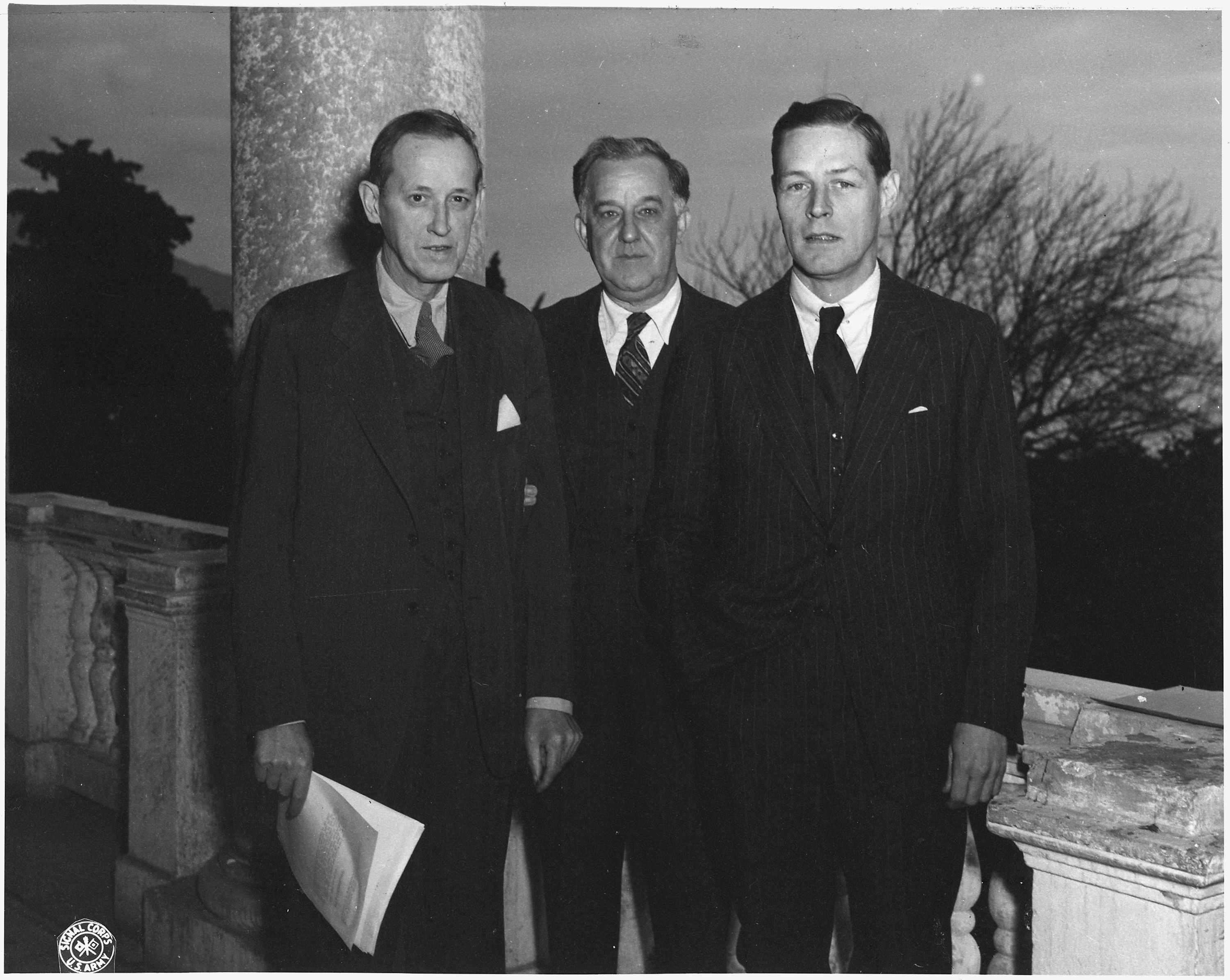
Bohlen (on right) in February, 1945

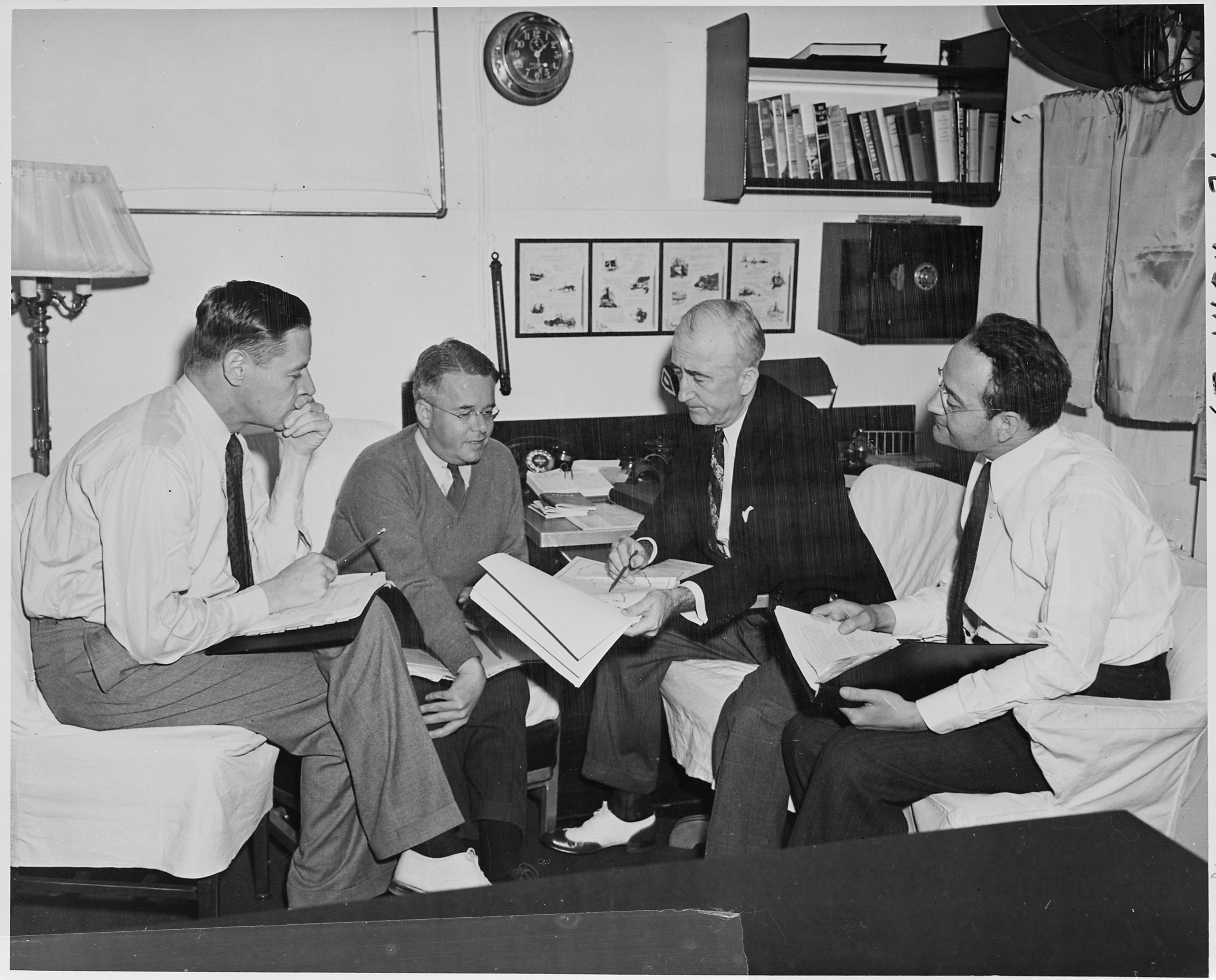
Bohlen on left consulting with Secretary of State James F. Byrnes and other advisors in preparation for the Potsdam Conference

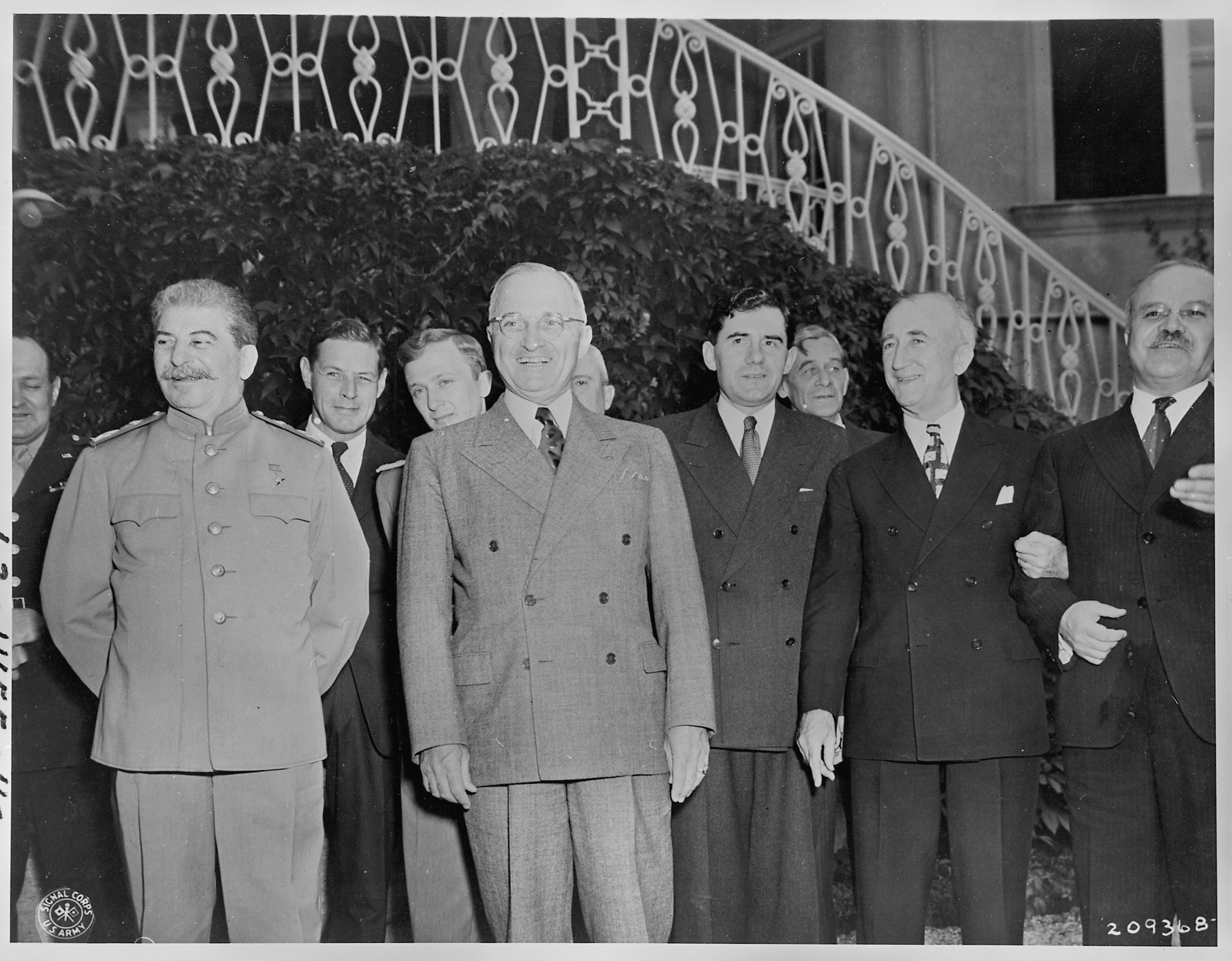
Bohlen standing between Joseph Stalin and Harry Truman at the Potsdam Conference

Bohlen joined the US Department of State in 1929. His first diplomatic post was in Prague. In 1931, he was transferred to Paris, where he studied Russian and became a Soviet specialist. In 1934, at 30, he joined the staff of the first US embassy to the Soviet Union in Moscow. On August 24, 1939, Bohlen received the full content of the secret Molotov–Ribbentrop Pact, signed only a day earlier, from Hans von Herwarth. The secret protocol contained an understanding between Adolf Hitler and Joseph Stalin to divide Central Europe, the Baltic States, and Finland between Germany and the Soviet Union. US President Franklin Roosevelt was urgently informed, but the US did not share the information with any of the governments concerned.

A week later, the plan was put into effect with the German and Soviet invasions of Poland, marking the beginning of World War II. In 1940 and 1941, he worked in the American embassy in Tokyo, where he was interned for six months before his release by the Japanese in mid-1942. In 1943, Bohlen became head of the East European Division, the first of the six specialists who started the Russian-language program in the late 1920s to become the head of a division of the State Department. He then worked on Soviet issues in the State Department during the war, accompanying Harry Hopkins on missions to Stalin in Moscow. He worked closely with Roosevelt and was his interpreter at the Tehran Conference in 1943 and the Yalta Conference in 1945. He also served as interpreter for US President Harry Truman at the Potsdam Conference in 1945. Bohlen later lamented that the Potsdam Conference was the beginning of the Cold War: "After Potsdam, there was little that could be done to induce the Soviet Union to become a reasonable and cooperative member of the world community. Discrepancies between the systems were too great, the hostility of the Soviet Union toward capitalist countries too great."

In 1946, Bohlen disagreed with his friend and mentor, Ambassador George F. Kennan, on how to deal with the Soviets. Kennan proposed a strategy of containment of Soviet expansion, but Bohlen was more cautious and recommended accommodation by allowing Stalin to have a sphere of influence in Eastern Europe without it being disturbed by the US. Bohlen, criticized by some of the hawks in the US Congress, paid close attention to public opinion as he considered domestic influence in a democracy to be inevitable. When George C. Marshall became Secretary of State in 1947, Bohlen became a key adviser to Truman. Bohlen, at Marshall's request and guidance, wrote Marshall's June 5, 1947 speech that led to the Marshall Plan. Bohlen was US minister to France from 1949 to 1951.

Kennan, declared persona non grata for some criticism of the Soviet Union in Berlin in September 1952, would not be allowed to return there. Oversight of the embassy was then awarded to Chargé d'Affaires Jacob Beam. On January 20, 1953, Dwight Eisenhower became US president. When Stalin died in March 1953, the post of ambassador was still vacant, and the embassy was still being led by Beam. In April 1953, Eisenhower named Bohlen as ambassador to the Soviet Union. The confirmation hearings were difficult as despite a recommendation from the Senate Foreign Relations Committee Bohlen's presence at Yalta was held against him by Democratic and Republican members of the Conservative coalition which controlled the Senate at the time. He was particularly criticized by Senator Joseph McCarthy, who claimed that Bohlen was both sympathetic to Communism and that he was homosexual. McCarthy also criticized Bohlen's brother-in-law, Charles W. Thayer, claiming that Thayer had a history of homosexuality as well. Both the Republican leader Robert Taft and the Democrat leader Lyndon Johnson, both associated with the coalition, supported him and Eisenhower's support was unstinting. After Thayer resigned, Bohlen was confirmed 74–13.

Bohlen oversaw several key events during his time as ambassador to the Soviet Union, including the rise of Georgy Malenkov to the premiership, the arrest and execution of Lavrentiy Beria, the ascendency of Nikita Khrushchev, the Hungarian Revolution and the Suez Crisis. Bohlen's relationship with US Secretary of State John Foster Dulles soured. He was demoted on April 18, 1957, by Eisenhower after Dulles forced Bohlen's resignation. Bohlen later served as ambassador to the Philippines from 1957 to 1959. He returned to the US in 1959 by request of Secretary of State Christian Herter to serve in the newly-formed Bureau of Soviet Affairs.

Bohlen served as ambassador to France from 1962 to 1968 under Presidents John F. Kennedy and Lyndon Johnson. According to the Kennedy advisor Theodore Sorensen, Bohlen participated in early discussions surrounding the Cuban Missile Crisis in October 1962. During an ExComm meeting on October 18, 1962, Dean Rusk read a letter he wrote the previous night during deliberations in which he advocated for dealing with Khrushchev through firm diplomatic action, followed by a declaration of war if his response was unsatisfactory.

To everyone's surprise, Bohlen kept reservations aboard an ocean liner that would take him to his Paris post as ambassador, rather than waiting until after the crisis had been resolved. He was thus absent for most of what was arguably the most important confrontation between the two superpowers of the Cold War. He was a consultant in 1968 and 1969 to the transition at the State Department from Secretary of State Dean Rusk to President Richard Nixon's first Secretary of State, William P. Rogers. Bohlen served as Acting Secretary of State in January 1969. Bohlen retired in January 1969.

== Death ==
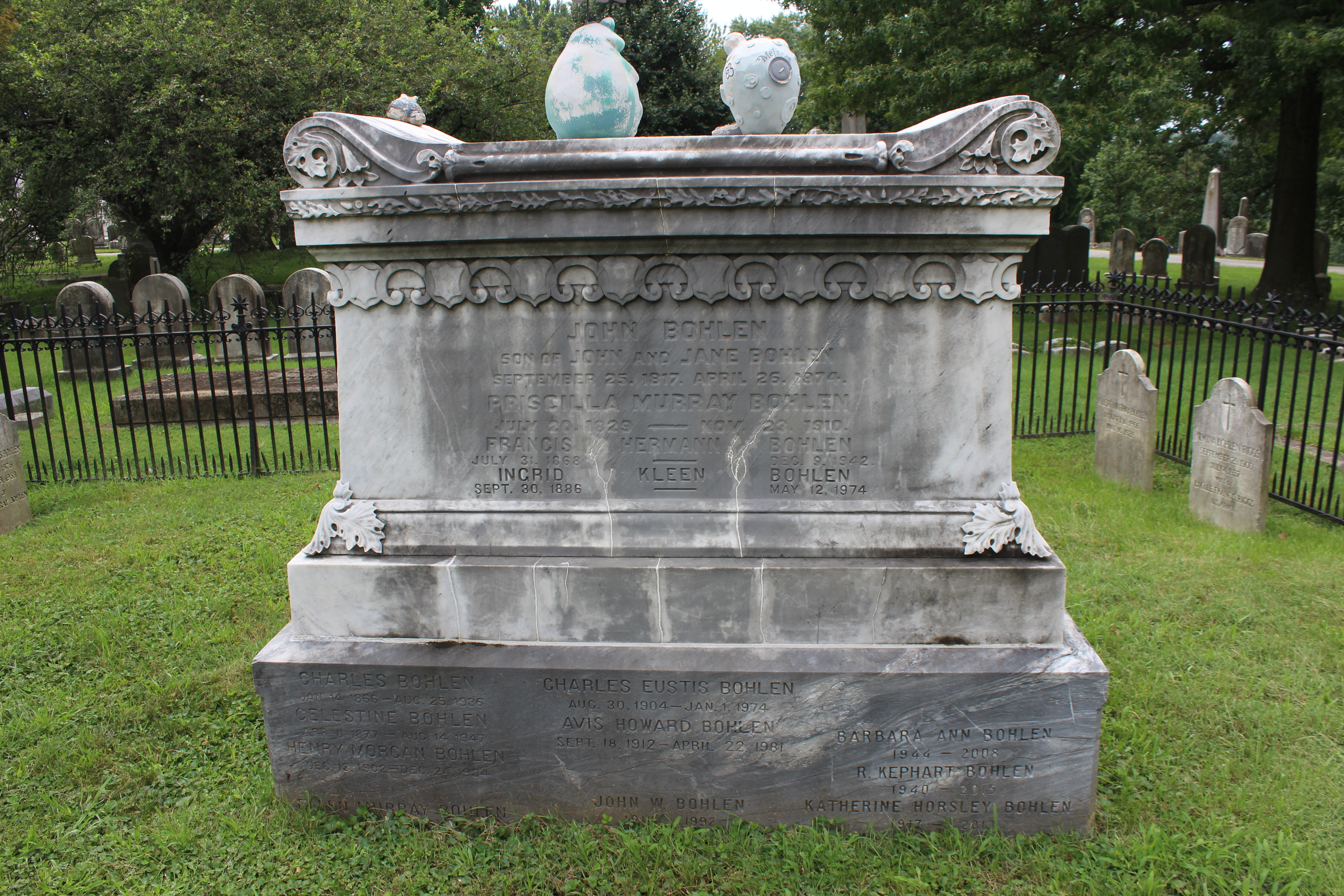
Charles is interred in the Bohlen family plot at Laurel Hill Cemetery in Philadelphia.

Bohlen died of pancreatic cancer in Washington, D.C., on January 1, 1974, at the age of 69. His funeral services, at St. Paul's Episcopal Church in Washington, D.C., on January 4, 1974, were followed by burial at Laurel Hill Cemetery, Philadelphia.

== Legacy ==
In May 2006, Bohlen was featured on a US postage stamp, one of a group of six prominent diplomats who was thus honored.

Diplomatic posts
Preceded by George F. Kennan	United States Ambassador to the Soviet Union; April 20, 1953 – April 18, 1957	Succeeded by Llewellyn Thompson
Preceded by Albert F. Nufer	United States Ambassador to the Philippines; June 4, 1957 – October 15, 1959	Succeeded by John D. Hickerson
Preceded by James M. Gavin	United States Ambassador to France; October 27, 1962 – February 9, 1968	Succeeded by Robert Sargent Shriver, Jr.
