= SS Mohawk =

A number of steamships were named Mohawk, including

- Mohawk, a US passenger ship in service 1896–1948
- Mohawk , a UK cargo ship in service 1900–1917, renamed Hungarian Prince in 1912 and Belgian Prince in 1915, and torpedoed by U-55
- Mohawk, a US cargo ship in service 1908–25 with Clyde Steamship Company
- Mohawk, a US passenger cargo ship in service 1926–35 with Clyde Steamship Company
