= Charles W. Thayer =

American diplomat and author

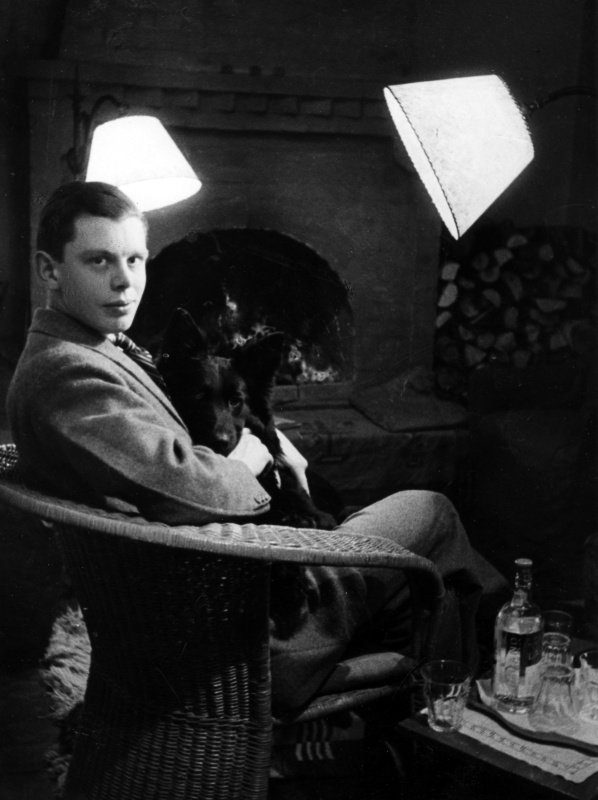
- Thayer around 1935

United States Minister to Afghanistan
- Acting, as chargé d'affaires
- In office June 6, 1942 – July 2, 1942
- President: Franklin D. Roosevelt
- Preceded by: Louis G. Dreyfus
- Succeeded by: Cornelius Van Hemert Engert

Personal details
- Born: Charles Wheeler Thayer; February 9, 1910 Villanova, Pennsylvania, United States
- Died: August 27, 1969 (aged 59) Salzburg, Austria
- Occupation: Diplomat, author, target of McCarthyism

Charles W. Thayer (February 9, 1910 – August 27, 1969) was an American diplomat and author. He was an expert on Soviet-American relations and headed the Voice of America.

== Early years ==
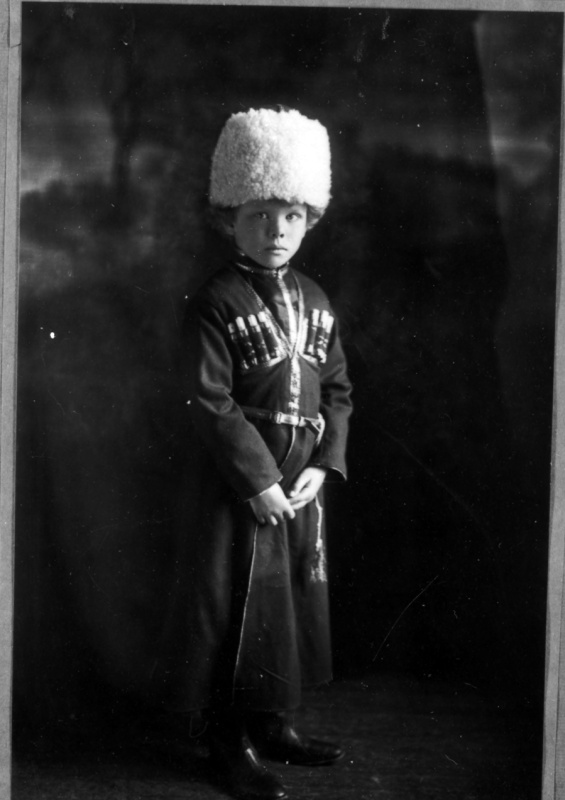
Thayer in 1914

Charles Wheeler Thayer was born in Villanova, Pennsylvania, the son of George Chapman Thayer, a shipbuilding engineer, and Gertrude May Wheeler Thayer. He attended St. Paul's School and the U.S. Military Academy, where he played polo, and graduated in 1933. He served for a few months as a cavalry lieutenant.

== Career ==
Thayer went to the Soviet Union to study Russian and won a position at the newly opened American Embassy in Moscow, first as personal secretary to Ambassador William Bullitt (a friend of Thayer's father) and then as Embassy Secretary. He taught a group of Russian cavalrymen to play polo so the Americans and Soviets could play "a hard-fought, clean, friendly match", and an embassy official recalled his "youthful exuberance" and "ready wit".

His sister Avis Howard Thayer visited him during his Moscow posting and met Charles E. Bohlen, with whom Thayer shared an apartment. She later married Bohlen, who served as American Ambassador to the Soviet Union from 1953 to 1957.

In 1937, Thayer became a Foreign Service officer, after passing his exams. In 1942, he was appointed chargé d'affaires in Kabul, Afghanistan in 1942. He was assigned for a time to the Office of Strategic Services (OSS), a forerunner of the Central Intelligence Agency (CIA), in Belgrade. Thayer served in London on the European Advisors Committee which drafted the German terms of surrender at the end of World War II.

He attended the Naval War College for a year at the end of the war. After the war, Thayer headed the OSS in Austria and served in 1946 on the Joint United States-Soviet Commission on Korea. He played a key role in developing the secret Office of Policy Coordination, later merged into the CIA, to counter and destabilize the Soviets (including its clandestine recruitment of former Nazis and collaborators for paramilitary operations).

Returning to the State Department, Thayer served briefly as consul general in Munich before returning to the United States to direct the Department's International Broadcasting Division (later known as the Voice of America) in 1948–49. He developed an antagonistic relationship with FBI Director J. Edgar Hoover when he complained publicly that the FBI's slow processing of security clearances was hampering the Division's staffing. Hoover's investigation of Thayer's secretary revealed that she had borne his child. The FBI pursued an investigation (although he did not require a security clearance from the FBI), and found he had "communist sympathy" and was "undoubtedly a homosexual". Hoover failed in two attempts (in 1949 and 1950) to persuade other government agencies that Thayer posed a security risk.

=== Resignation ===
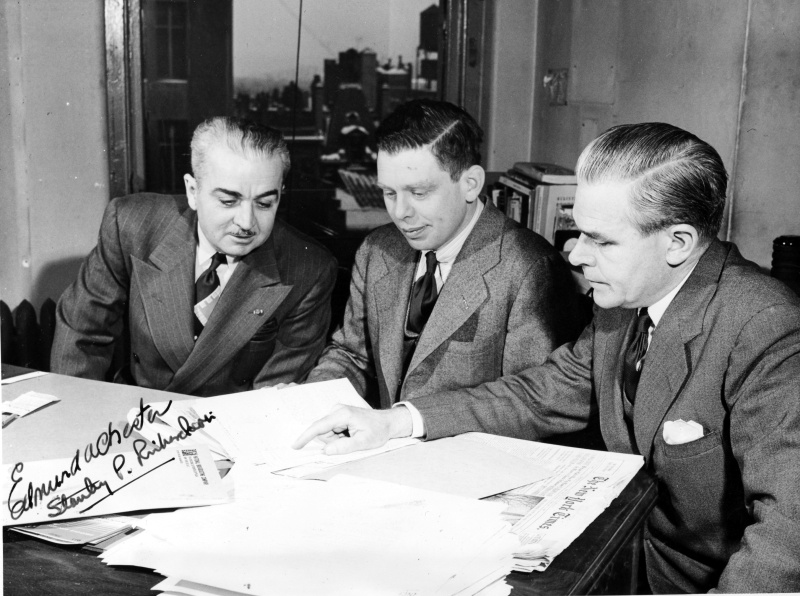
From left: Edmund A. Chester, Thayer, and Stanley P. Richardson in 1948

Thayer held consular positions in Germany from 1949 to 1953. Beginning in 1950, when Thayer was serving as political liaison officer in the Bonn embassy, several anonymous letters denounced him to Senator Joseph McCarthy and his Senate allies as a Communist sympathizer with a history of financial profiteering and sexual immorality both homosexual and heterosexual. He was being protected, according to one of the anonymous sources, by allies in the State Department, especially his brother-in-law, Charles E. Bohlen. Senate investigators used these letters and other documents obtained from a variety of government security investigations to target a series of government officials, starting with the forced resignation of Carmel Offie from the CIA in May 1950.

The evidence against Thayer collected by Senate investigators was based on "hostile gossip and speculation by Thayer's enemies, and premised on guilt by association." They learned, for example, that during his OSS service "Thayer was waited on regularly by a native Yugoslav waiter named Marko, who was a known homosexual." Thayer's marriage to Maria Petrucci, the daughter of an Italian diplomat, lasted less than two years, which one informant attributed to homosexuality, though she later denied this. Thayer was a friend of Alexander Kirk, a Foreign Service officer with a homosexual reputation who had retired in 1945, and others. Much of the impulse behind the investigations of political and sexual irregularities reflected resentment of the foreign policy establishment, their elite backgrounds, cosmopolitanism, and association with bohemians and the politically unorthodox.

Senate pressure forced the State Department to review Thayer's status. He returned from Germany to testify that "he had never performed a homosexual act." Though cleared, he remained under surveillance by the State Department's security division. When Thayer was moved to a new post in Munich and Senator Pat McCarran demanded a full report on his "experience, qualifications, moral character, and loyalty," the State Department waited a month to respond with a glowing report, which included no qualifications. McCarthy renewed and expanded his attacks following Republican gains in the 1952 elections when the new Secretary of State, John Foster Dulles, decided to co-operate with Senate investigators.

Finally, at the end of March 1953, after much bureaucratic infighting, Thayer was forced to resign in order to win Senate confirmation of his brother-in-law, Charles Bohlen, as Ambassador to Russia. The Süddeutsche Zeitung regretted his departure and expressed concern that the effect on government operations of a "wave of McCarthyism ... must be devastating".

== Later years ==
Thayer moved to Majorca to live inexpensively beyond the reach of Senate subpoenas. He found some employment opportunities blocked and blamed State Department security officials, though the FBI was responsible. He joked in his diary that "under Stalin you went to Siberia, under Hitler to Dachau or Buchenwald but under McCarthy to Majorca, which counts as progress." He tried without success to have his State Department file amended to make it clear that he resigned because he had a heterosexual affair while married. To support Thayer, his father-in-law, James Dunn, refused an appointment as Ambassador to Brazil. Thayer wrote but did not publish an autobiographical novel based on his experiences as a victim of McCarthyism and the purge of homosexuals from government service. In 1959, he accompanied W. Averell Harriman, who was reporting for a newspaper syndicate, on a 6-week tour of the Soviet Union.

== Personal life ==
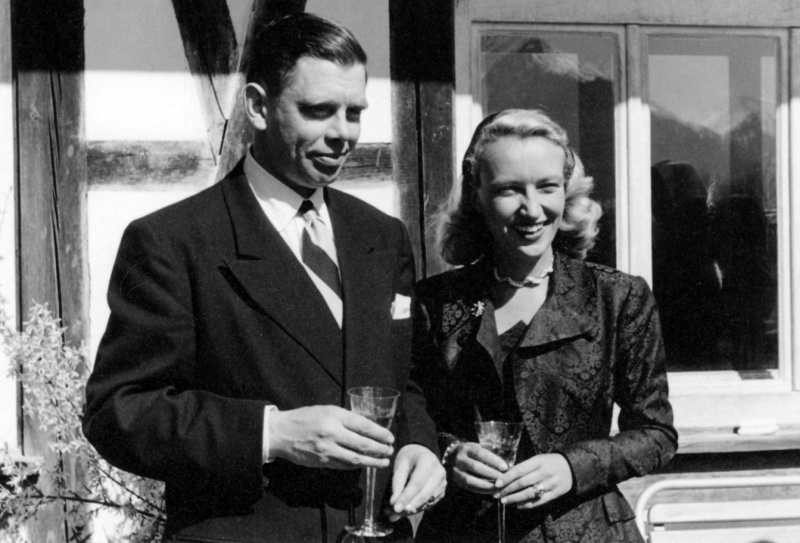
Charles and Cynthia Thayer on Wedding Day in 1950

Thayer married Cynthia Dunn Cochrane, a divorcée and the daughter of James Clement Dunn, U.S. Ambassador to Italy, on March 28, 1950. He was fluent in Russian, French, German, Spanish, Serbian, Italian, Bulgarian, Slovene, and Persian.

Thayer and his wife, Cynthia, had a son, James. In retirement Thayer and his wife lived half the year in Villanova and half the year outside of Munich. He later divided his time between homes in Philadelphia, United States, and Salzburg, Austria. He died during a heart operation in Salzburg on August 27, 1969. He was interred at the Church of the Redeemer Cemetery in Bryn Mawr, Pennsylvania.

== Publications ==
Thayer wrote several works reflecting his experiences in government service:

- Thayer, Charles W. (1951). Bears in the Caviar. Philadelphia: Lippincott. LCCN 51010087. OCLC 1056111884.
- Thayer, Charles W. (1952). Hands Across the Caviar. Philadelphia: Lippincott. LCCN 52010934. OCLC 1652966. S2CID 160441087.
- Thayer, Charles W. (1957). The Unquiet Germans. New York City: Harper. LCCN 56011088. OCLC 396425.
- Thayer, Charles W. (1959). Diplomat. Westport, Connecticut: Greenwood Press. LCCN 74006780. OCLC 940574.
- Thayer, Charles W. (1962). Moscow Interlude: A Novel. New York City: Harper. LCCN 62007901. OCLC 1389784.
- Thayer, Charles W. (1963). Guerrilla. New York City: Harper & Row. LCCN 63016521. OCLC 567794.
- Thayer, Charles W. (1964). Checkpoint: A Novel. New York City: Harper & Row. LCCN 63020306. OCLC 35288332.
- Thayer, Charles W. (1966). Muzzy. New York City: Harper & Row. LCCN 66016629. OCLC 1344487.

== Bibliography ==
- Anderson, David L. (2003). The Human Tradition in America Since 1945. Wilmington, Delaware: Scholarly Resources. ISBN 978-0-8420-2943-8. LCCN 2003007500. OCLC 1404192900. S2CID 152289019.
- Henderson, Loy Wesley; Baer, George W. (1986). A Question of Trust: The Origins of U.S.-Soviet Diplomatic Relations : the Memoirs of Loy W. Henderson. Stanford, California: Hoover Institution Press. ISBN 978-0-8179-8331-4. LCCN 86007386. OCLC 13498458. S2CID 161906046.
- Grose, Peter (2000). Operation Rollback: America's Secret War Behind the Iron Curtain. Boston: Houghton Mifflin Harcourt. ISBN 978-0-395-51606-5. LCCN 99089830. OCLC 1120331355. S2CID 106458418.
- Dean, Robert D. (2001). Imperial Brotherhood: Gender and the Making of Cold War Foreign Policy. Amherst, Massachusetts: University of Massachusetts Press. ISBN 978-1-55849-312-4. JSTOR j.ctt5vk4zg. LCCN 2001005553. OCLC 1073369523. S2CID 152341725. Project MUSE book 4311.
