= Charles A. Peabody =

American judge and lawyer

Charles Augustus Peabody
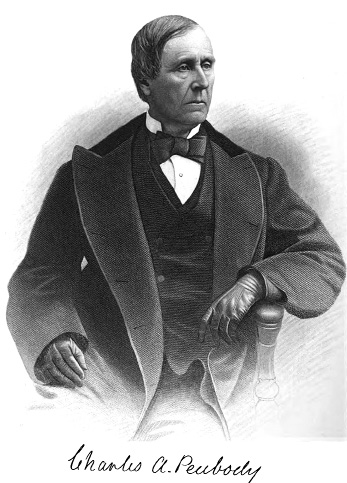

Judge of the United States Provisional Court for the State of Louisiana
- In office 1863–1865

Personal details
- Born: July 10, 1814 Sandwich, New Hampshire
- Died: July 3, 1901 (aged 86) New York City, New York
- Education: Harvard College
- Alma mater: Harvard Law School
- Profession: Attorney, Judge

Charles Augustus Peabody (born July 10, 1814 – July 3, 1901) was a prominent New York attorney and a judge of the United States Provisional Court for the State of Louisiana during the American Civil War, from 1863 to 1865.

== Early life, education, and career ==
Born in Sandwich, New Hampshire, Peabody established himself in New York City as a young man. In 1834, Peabody began the study of law in Baltimore, in the office of Nathaniel Williams, then United States District Attorney of Maryland. After two years, Peabody moved to Massachusetts and pursued his studies in the Law School of Harvard College. In 1839, he moved to New York, where he entered began the practice of law, and "became identified socially, through domestic ties, with the most eminent families of the metropolis".

== Political and judicial activities ==
In 1855, Peabody participated in the formation of the Republican Party in New York in 1855, and in 1856 he was appointed a judge of the New York Supreme Court (the trial-level court of the state). In 1858, he was appointed a quarantine commissioner to succeed ex-Governor Horatio Seymour.

In 1862, with the government of Louisiana having voted to join the Confederate States of America and declaring its secession from the United States, President Abraham Lincoln issued an executive order stating that the insurrection "having temporarily subverted and swept away the civil institutions of that State, including the judiciary and the judicial authorities of the Union" made it necessary to appoint "some judicial tribunal existing there capable of administering justice". Therefore, Lincoln stated in this order:

I do hereby constitute, a provisional court, which shall be a court of record for the State of Louisiana, and I do hereby appoint Charles A. Peabody, of New York, to be a provisional judge to hold said court, with authority to hear, try and determine all causes, civil and criminal, including causes in law, equity, revenue, and admiralty, and particularly all such powers and jurisdiction as belong to the district and circuit courts of the United States, conforming his proceedings, so far as possible, to the course of proceedings and practice which has been customary in the courts of the United States and Louisiana — his judgment to be final and conclusive.

When the U.S. Department of State instituted a numbering scheme in 1907, it retroactively identified this as United States Executive Order 1. Peabody was commissioned Chief Justice of Louisiana, appointed court officers, and drew a salary, but never heard a case.

== Personal life ==
Peabody was married three times, the first time to Julia Caroline Livingston of the Livingston family of New York, with whom he had three sons and a daughter, his sons including the prominent attorney, Charles A. Peabody Jr. and lawyer Philip G. Peabody.

Julia died in 1878. Peabody's second wife was Mary Eliza Hamilton, a cousin of Mrs. Astor, a daughter of John Church Hamilton and granddaughter of Alexander Hamilton, one of the Founding Fathers of the United States. After Mary's death in 1887, he married for a third time to Athenia Livingston (née Bowen), the widow of James Bowen (his "old-time warm friend and associate") and daughter of Anthony Rutgers Livingston (brother to U.S. Representative Robert Le Roy Livingston).

He died at his residence in New York City, at the age of 87.
