= Elliot Cowdin =

American politician

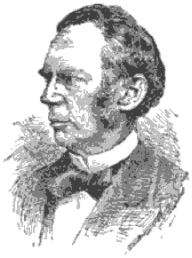

Member of the New York State Assembly
- In office 1877
- Constituency: 11th District

Personal details
- Born: August 8, 1819 Jamaica, Vermont, U.S.
- Died: April 12, 1880 (aged 60) New York, New York, U.S.
- Party: Republican
- Spouse: Sarah Katharine Waldron (m. 1853)
- Children: 6
- Occupation: Businessman, politician

Elliot Christopher Cowdin I (August 8, 1819 - April 12, 1880) was an American businessman and politician. He served one term in the New York State Assembly in 1877, representing the 11th district.

== Life ==
Elliot C. Cowdin was the son of Angier and Abiah (Carter) Cowdin. He born in on August 8, 1819, in Jamaica, Vermont, but grew up mainly in Boston, Massachusetts, where the family moved to after his father's death.

Cowdin became involved in the silk trade in the 1840s and, in 1852, he moved to New York City to establish his own business, Elliot C. Cowdin & Company, an importing firm that specialized in "ribbons, silks, flowers and other Paris novelties." The business had a branch office in Paris, France and Cowdin maintained a second home there. He was also active in politics; as a speaker and lecturer; and in several civic organizations, including the New York Chamber of Commerce, the New England Society of New York, the Bedford Farmers' Club, and the Union League, which he had helped to found.

Cowdin married Sarah Katharine Waldron (1827–1903), the daughter of Samuel W. and Martha (Melcher) Waldron, on September 13, 1853. They had six children: Katharine W., John Elliot, Martha G., Winthrop, Alice, and Elliot.

Elliot Cowdin died at his home in New York on April 12, 1880.

== Political career ==
Cowdin held some appointed posts in government, including that of U.S. Commissioner to the Paris Expedition in 1867. He was also a member of the 100th New York State Legislature in 1877, elected to the New York State Assembly as a Republican representative of the 11th District (New York County). His interests as an Assemblyman, as indicated by the bills he introduced, included government reform, taxation and finance, and trade and commerce. Cowdin served just one term, declining afterward to run for reelection.

New York State Assembly
Preceded by Charles A. Peabody, Jr.	New York State Assembly; New York County, 11th District; 1877	Succeeded by William W. Astor
