= James B. Eustis =

American politician (1834–1899)

James Biddle Eustis
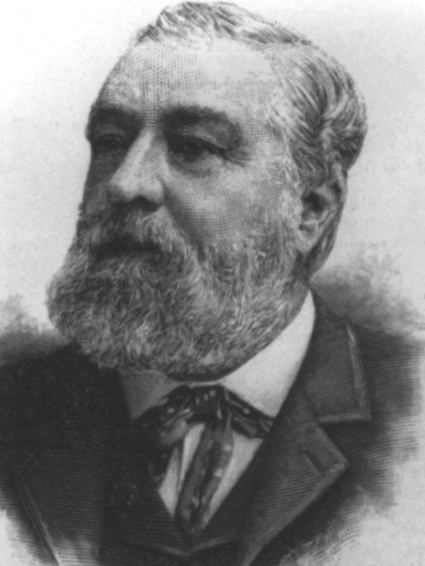

United States Senator from Louisiana
- In office March 4, 1885 – March 3, 1891
- Preceded by: Benjamin F. Jonas
- Succeeded by: Edward D. White
- In office January 12, 1876 – March 3, 1879
- Preceded by: William P. Kellogg
- Succeeded by: Benjamin F. Jonas

United States Ambassador to France
- In office May 6, 1893 – May 24, 1897
- President: Grover Cleveland
- Preceded by: T. Jefferson Coolidge
- Succeeded by: Horace Porter

Member of the Louisiana Senate
- In office 1874-1878

Member of the Louisiana House of Representatives
- In office 1872

Personal details
- Born: James Biddle Eustis; August 27, 1834 New Orleans, Louisiana, U.S.
- Died: September 9, 1899 (aged 65) Newport, Rhode Island, U.S.
- Resting place: Cave Hill Cemetery; Louisville, Kentucky, U.S.
- Party: Democratic
- Spouse: Ellen Buckner
- Relations: George Eustis Jr. (brother); Charles Bohlen (grandson)
- Children: 4
- Parent: George Eustis Sr. (father)
- Education: Harvard Law School

James Biddle Eustis (August 27, 1834 – September 9, 1899) was a United States senator from Louisiana who served as President Cleveland's ambassador to France.

== Early life ==
Born in New Orleans, he was the son of George Eustis (1796–1858) and Clarice (née Allain) Eustis. His father was a lawyer who served as a Chief Justice of the Louisiana Supreme Court. James's brother, George Eustis Jr., was a United States representative from Louisiana.

James pursued classical studies, graduated from the Harvard Law School in 1854, was admitted to the bar in 1856.

== Career ==
After his admission to the bar, he commenced practice in New Orleans. He served as judge advocate during the Civil War in the Confederate Army and resumed the practice of law in New Orleans.

He was elected a member of the Louisiana House of Representatives prior to the Reconstruction acts, and was one of the committee sent to Washington, D.C. to confer with President Andrew Johnson on Louisiana affairs. He was again a member of the State house of representatives in 1872, and was a member of the Louisiana Senate from 1874 to 1878.

Eustis was elected as a Democrat to the U.S. Senate to fill the vacancy in the term commencing March 4, 1873, caused by the action of the Senate in declining to seat rival claimants William L. McMillen and P. B. S. Pinchback. Eustis served from January 12, 1876, to March 3, 1879; he was an unsuccessful candidate for reelection, and was professor of civil law at the Tulane University Law School from 1877 to 1884, then called the University of Louisiana. He was again elected to the U.S. Senate and served from March 4, 1885, to March 3, 1891; he was not a candidate for reelection, and practiced law in Washington, D.C., in 1891.

While a sitting senator, Eustis wrote a controversial essay for The Forum titled "Race Antagonism in the South," in which he complained that "The white man's patience is to-day taxed as ever by the unending complaints of the Negro and his friends" and that Blacks "continue to appeal to what he considers the inexhaustible sympathies of the white race" despite having "every advantage over every other laboring class in the world."

If his lot is to continue to be one of inferiority, rather than appeal to the political favoritism of the federal government, or to the partisan sympathies of Northern philanthropists, as he has done in the past, he should rely implicitly upon the magnanimity of his white fellow-citizens of the South, to treat him with the justice and generosity due to his unfortunate condition.

The essay prompted vigorous responses from supporters of civil rights, including George Washington Cable, Albion Winegar Tourgée, Atticus Greene Haygood, and others.

From 1893 to 1897 he was ambassador extraordinary and plenipotentiary to France, and then settled in New York City.

== Personal life ==
Eustis was married to Ellen Buckner (1836–1895), a daughter of Henry Sullivan Buckner, a cotton broker who built a mansion at 1410 Jackson Avenue in New Orleans in 1856, and Catharine (née Allan) Buckner. Ellen was an aunt to Mortimer N. Buckner, president and chairman of the New York Trust Company. Together, James and Ellen were the parents of:

- William A. Eustis (1860–1863), who died young.
- Marie Clarice Eustis (1866–1956), who married George Peabody Eustis Corcoran (1864–1936) in 1887. They divorced and she married pianist Josef Hofmann in 1905.
- James Biddle Eustis Jr. (1872–1915), who married Nina Floyd Crosby (1881–1966)
- Celestine Eustis (1877–1947), who married Charles Bohlen (1866–1936) in 1902.

Eustis died in Newport, Rhode Island on September 9, 1899. He was interred at Cave Hill Cemetery in Louisville, Kentucky. He was a member of The Boston Club of New Orleans.

=== Descendants ===
Through his daughter Celestine, he was posthumously a grandfather of diplomat Charles Bohlen (1904–1974), who served as the United States Ambassador to the Soviet Union, the Philippines and France.

== Bibliography ==
- United States Congress. "James B. Eustis (id: E000229)". Biographical Directory of the United States Congress. Retrieved on February 13, 2008

U.S. Senate
Preceded by William Kellogg (– November 1, 1872); Vacant (1872–1876)	U.S. senator (Class 3) from Louisiana; January 12, 1876 – March 3, 1879; Served alongside: Joseph R. West, William P. Kellogg	Succeeded by Benjamin F. Jonas
Preceded by Benjamin F. Jonas	U.S. senator (Class 3) from Louisiana; 1885–1891; Served alongside: Randall L. Gibson	Succeeded by Edward D. White
Diplomatic posts
Preceded by T. Jefferson Coolidge	U.S. Ambassador to France; 1893–1897	Succeeded by Horace Porter
