= Edson O. Sessions =

Edson Oliver Sessions (November 5, 1902 Toledo, Ohio – November 15, 1987 Laguna Hills, California) was a consulting engineer from Chicago who served as the American ambassador to Finland (1959–1960) and Ecuador (1968–1970).

== Biography ==
Sessions graduated with a B.S. from Harvard University in 1925. He died at his home in Laguna Hills.

== Career ==
In 1925 he was made Vice President in Charge of Construction for his father's firm, the E.O. Sessions Engineering Company. In 1930, he went to work for Bendix Aviation. When his father died, Sessions took over his father's business until he sold it in 1954. (Another source says he stayed at Bendix until 1935, when he opened up his own company called Sessions Engineering Company of Chicago). Sessions was appointed Deputy Postmaster General by Dwight D. Eisenhower and served until Lyndon B. Johnson appointed him Ambassador to Ecuador.
