= SS Mohawk (1925) =

American ship

History

United States
- Name: Mohawk
- Namesake: Mohawk
- Owner: Clyde Steamship Co. (1926–1933); Clyde-Mallory Line (1933–1934); Agwilines Inc (1934–1935)
- Port of registry: New York
- Ordered: 22 January 1925
- Builder: Newport News Ship Building & Drydock Co., Newport News
- Cost: US$2,000,000
- Yard number: 287
- Laid down: 1 April 1925
- Launched: 21 October 1925
- Sponsored by: Miss Margaret Denison
- Completed: 28 January 1926
- Commissioned: 6 February 1926
- Maiden voyage: 9 February 1926
- Out of service: 24 January 1935
- Identification: US official number 225247; code letters MFVR (1926–1933); call sign KFYU (1934–1935)
- Fate: Sank, 24 January 1935

General characteristics
- Type: Passenger cargo ship
- Tonnage: 5,896 GRT; 3,514 NRT
- Length: 387 ft 5 in (118.08 m)
- Beam: 54 ft 3 in (16.54 m)
- Depth: 20 ft 0 in (6.10 m)
- Installed power: 981 nhp
- Propulsion: 2 x Newport News Ship Building & Drydock Co. steam turbines, single reduction geared to one screw
- Speed: 15.0 knots (17.3 mph; 27.8 km/h)
- Capacity: 446 Passengers

Mohawk was a passenger cargo steam turbine-powered ship built in 1925–1926 by Newport News Ship Building & Drydock Co. of Newport News for Clyde Steamship Company with intention of operating between New York and Jacksonville. She was luxuriously equipped, and regularly carried celebrity passengers. In 1929, her schedule was extended to Galveston, and she also operated winter cruises to various Caribbean destinations. On 24 January 1935, after leaving New York City on one of her regularly scheduled trips, she suffered a failure of her automatic steering gear and collided with Norwegian cargo ship Talisman. Mohawk sank after about an hour with a loss of 31 crew and 16 passengers.

== Design and construction ==
Early in January 1925, after a fire and complete destruction of their largest passenger ship Mohawk, Clyde Steamship Co. decided to build another ship to replace their lost liner similar in size and design to two ships being constructed at the time, Seminole and Cherokee. The contract for the new ship was awarded to the Newport News Ship Building & Drydock Co. on January 22, 1925, and the ship, also to be named Mohawk, soon was laid down at the shipbuilder's yard in Newport News (yard number 287) and launched on 21 October 1925, with Miss Margaret Denison of Rye, New York, daughter of J. B. Denison, First Vice-president of the Clyde Steamship Company, serving as the sponsor.

The ship was designed primarily for passenger transportation and in addition to two decks, also had a hurricane or sun deck constructed on top. The ship provided berths in single cabins or suites for 446 passengers, and had all the staterooms and saloons located throughout all three decks. In addition, a veranda café and a spacious dining hall able to sit 180 people at once, a musical lounge, a library, a large dancing deck, and smoking rooms were also constructed to provide entertainment for the would be passengers. Mohawk had electric lights in cabins and along the decks, hot and cold water in all her suites, and was also equipped with wireless of De Forest type. She also had evaporating and distilling plants installed to provide passengers with fresh water throughout their voyage. Mohawk had freight decks separated into lighted, ventilated watertight compartments, some of them chilled with refrigerating machinery, supplied with large number of side ports for quick loading and unloading of the cargo. Space was also specially designed and reserved for passengers to bring their automobiles with them. She was also equipped with automatic fire detection system, as well as steam, salt water and Foamite fire extinguishing systems.

Her sea trials were held on January 23, 1926, off the Virginia Capes during which she performed satisfactorily and exceeded her contract speed. After an inspection, she was transferred to her owners and left for New York on February 6.

As built, the ship was 387 feet 5 inches (118.08 m) long (between perpendiculars) and 54 feet 3 inches (16.54 m) abeam, a depth of 20 feet 0 inches (6.10 m). Mohawk was assessed at 5,896 GRT and 3,514 NRT and had loaded displacement of 8,140 long tons (8,271 t). The ship had a steel hull with double bottom, and two oil-burning steam turbines, producing 981 nhp, single reduction geared to one screw propeller, that moved the ship at up to 15.0 knots (17.3 mph; 27.8 km/h).

== Operational history ==
Upon delivery Mohawk sailed from Hampton Roads for New York on February 6, 1926. After taking on board a full complement of passengers, many of them being of prominence, she left on her maiden voyage on February 9 for Charleston and Jacksonville. Many special entertainment events were planned on her maiden voyage including theatrical plays and special performance by her own orchestra. The ship left Jacksonville for her return trip on June 13, and arrived at New York on February 15, thus bringing her maiden voyage to successful conclusion.

Mohawk continued serving the same route for the major part of her career, connecting Charleston and Jacksonville with New York, with occasional stops at Brunswick. She carried various general cargo from the southern ports, mostly lumber, cotton, naval stores, vegetables and fruit.

In early March 1927 Mohawk carried Aimee Semple McPherson from New York to Florida at the time of her "vindication tour" during which she visited numerous cities taking advantage of the publicity her kidnapping story created to preach the Gospel.

=== Collision ===
In the afternoon of May 19, 1928 Mohawk slowly left her pier in Brooklyn on her usual trip down to Charleston and Jacksonville. Her commander was Captain J.W. MacKenzie, she had a crew of 100 men and was carrying general cargo and 89 passengers. Due to heavy rain the night before, the weather was very foggy in and around New York harbor and the fog slowly spread out from the city to surrounding waters throughout the day. As a result, all in and out New York traffic was moving very cautiously due to visibility being no more than a few feet.

Shortly after 15:00 as Mohawk was slowly proceeding down the Lower Bay on her way out, an oncoming ship, later determined to be Old Dominion Line steamship Jefferson coming from Norfolk with 67 passengers, was suddenly sighted ahead. Due to very short distance between the ships, nothing could be done to avert the collision, and at about 15:11 Jefferson smashed into Mohawk' starboard side just forward of amidships opening a wide gap. Mohawk immediately started taking on water but the pumps were employed and managed to slow down the water intake, yet the ship soon developed a list to port side. Captain MacKenzie, however, being unsure of the seriousness of his ship's injury decided to ground her and headed towards the nearest land, eventually beaching the ship on Normandie Beach, near Sea Bright. In the meantime, Jefferson backed out of collision and slowly proceeded to anchor herself off Ambrose Channel north off Sandy Hook to wait out the fog and determine the extent of sustained damage.

After evaluating the damage, captain MacKenzie realized the ship was in no danger of sinking and decided to wait for the tide and try to refloat the ship with the aid of tugs and return to New York. However, the heavy seas turned Mohawk around with her broadside facing the waves and breakers and early in the evening it was decided to evacuate the passengers. By 21:00 all passengers were safely transferred to the US Coast Guard cutter Seminole which was standing by Mohawk while the captain and the crew remained aboard the ship. Due to prevailing fog, the passengers had to spend the night on board Seminole and were then landed by the cutter at St. George by 14:00 the next day. By 22:00 Mohawk developed a heavier list and about an hour later her lights went out as her engine room became flooded.

In order to refloat the steamship, a patch was placed over the hole and water was pumped out and then a layer of ice was created over the canvas using the ship's refrigeration machinery. Two attempts were made but proved unsuccessful but on the third try Mohawk was successfully refloated in the evening of May 21 during high tide and towed to New York by two wrecking tugs. There she unloaded all the remaining cargo and all passenger baggage and proceeded to drydock for evaluation and repairs. Mohawk returned to her regular service in late June.

=== Resumption of regular service ===
After successful completion of repairs, Mohawk returned to her usual coastal route. In September 1928 during one of her trips down south she picked one of the survivors of the blast on board tanker Shreveport off North Carolina coast. Early in the morning on March 5, 1929, while yet on another journey from New York with 195 passengers and general cargo, including a good-will delegation from South Carolina bound for Havana, Mohawk ran aground on the north bank of the St. John's River about fifteen miles from Jacksonville after the ship ran into a strong gale at the entrance to the mouth of the river. The passengers were never in any danger, but it took several attempts to dislodge the ship before she arrived in Jacksonville later in the evening on the same day.

In May 1929 Mallory Line inaugurated their new service from Galveston to Miami and Mohawk was chosen to be the first steamship to sail on this route. From that point forward Mohawk would continue sailing on the route from New York to Miami to Galveston during the summer months, and would largely serve as a cruise ship during winter months carrying passengers from New York to the destinations in the West Indies, or maintaining regular New York to Jacksonville service.

On July 3, 1933 Mohawk while on her return trip from Galveston ran into the fringes of a tropical storm in the Gulf of Mexico but escaped largely unscathed with an exception of two injured musicians.

In the early morning of August 28, 1934 the liner ran aground on the south side of the Galveston channel while trying to navigate into port in thick weather. The passengers were never in danger and the ship was eventually refloated with the aid of tugs a few hours later.

=== Sinking ===
Mohawk left New York City for Havana on the afternoon of 24 January 1935 with 110 crew, 53 passengers and a general cargo of car parts and china on board. She sailed under the command of Captain Joseph Edward Wood. Passengers included Mary Pillsbury Lord (survived); her sister Katherine Pillsbury McKee (survived); New York architect Julian Livingston Peabody (died); his wife, socialite Celestine Hitchcock Peabody (daughter of Thomas Hitchcock Sr.) (died); Prof. Herdman Fitzgerald Cleland of Williams College (died); Rev. Dr. Francis L. Frost of the St. Mary's Protestant Episcopal Church, Staten Island (died); John Telfer, designated Vice Consul in Orizaba, Mexico (died); his wife, Catherine Butler Telfer (died); Gertrude Oakes, sister of Harry Oakes, 1st Baronet of Nassau (died).

Four hours after having left New York Harbor at about 9 PM, the Mohawk spotted the Norwegian cargo ship Talisman at a distance of 0.125 nautical miles (232 m). At this point the ship was several miles south of Sea Girt Light and about six miles offshore, when suddenly the Mohawk suffered a failure of her automatic steering gear which made her crew revert to the manual steering system. But due to confusion between orders from the bridge to the engine room and further problems steering the ship, Mohawk accidentally made a hard turn to port which made her veer off course and steam at full speed into the path of Talisman. Both ships tried to avoid a collision, but it was already too late.

Talisman struck Mohawk on her port side and left a deep gash in her bow. After the collision Mohawk came to a complete standstill and began to take on water. Nearly every passenger and crew member felt the force of the collision and made their way to deck. It was very cold on deck as the temperature reached two degrees below zero and the lifeboats were covered in snow. The lifeboats were quickly undone from their snow coats and were being lowered by both passengers and crew as the ship was beginning to list. About an hour after the collision, the Mohawk rolled onto her starboard side and finally disappeared beneath the waves. Most of her lifeboats managed to be launched, yet 16 passengers and 31 crew went down with the ship, including all but one of the ship's officers. None of the bridge officers survived the accident and Captain Joseph Wood, after verifying that all other persons had safely evacuated the ship, went back to his cabin and shut the door.

In the hours after the sinking, Limon and Mohawk's sister ship Algonquin rescued a total of six life boats with just over 100 survivors. The survivors were taken back to shore where some were met by journalists and cameramen asking questions about the disaster. The search for survivors continued through the night and the next day as Coast Guard boats and planes scanned the surface, but ultimately the search operation was looking for the remains of the dead rather than any more survivors.

=== Blame ===
As was always done with a disaster which resulted in the loss of human life, an inquiry researched who was to blame for the incident. It was concluded that Mohawk caused the initial collision by veering off course. Although this alone would not explain why the Talisman ended up hitting the Mohawk, some speculate that the Mohawk's navigation lights also failed. The blame for the collision rests mostly with mechanical malfunction or human error on the Mohawk's part.

It was also noted that the damage inflicted by the collision should not have been enough to sink the Mohawk. But it appears that during the Great Depression the Mohawk's owner modified the ship to carry bulk cargoes so as to squeeze some extra revenue out of the ship. These modifications involved opening up the ship's watertight bulkheads for easier cargo handling. Because of this, the Mohawk had no defense against the frigid waters that were making their way through her gaping wound which ended in her demise.

== Wreck ==
Mohawk sank to a depth of 24.38 metres (80 ft 0 in) and broke open on the sea floor where she lay on her starboard side until she was righted by storms. But the wreck's tallest parts which included the bridge and smokestack were a hazard in the busy New Jersey shipping lane. So in July 1935 the Army Corps of Engineers went to the wreck and removed her fuel oil. After that, over 8 tons of dynamite was used to demolish the wreck. The first blast alone used almost a ton and blew out the center of the damaged port side of the hull which made the superstructure collapse onto the main deck. After that two tugboats were dispatched to wire-drag the wreck to the required 15.24 metres (50 ft 0 in) depth clearance. During the moving, a heavy steel cable was forced back and forth through the superstructure which snapped the deck plates apart and ripped the bridge from the hull, scattering debris into the currents.

A few years later during World War II, the Coast Guard bombed the Mohawk with depth charges as German U-boats had been hiding alongside wrecks in these waters as to dodge sonar waves. Apparentally the ship was depth charged a second time during the war when a US Navy blimp mistook the wreck for a German U-boat.

Ultimately one anchor and the propeller were salvaged as the other anchor is buried beneath the bow. At present day, the wreck rests eight miles east of Manasquan Inlet at 40°01′N 73°55′W and covers several acres. Her last cargo of a number of trucks or automobiles, large rubber tires, axles, and other parts are tangled up with the rest of the wreckage. All the structure supplies a home for aquatic life such as mussels, red sea anemones, lobsters and various types of fish.
