= John Cheever Cowdin =

American financier

J. Cheever Cowdin
- Born: March 17, 1889; New York City, US
- Died: September 16, 1960 (aged 71); New York City, US
- Occupations: Financier, polo player
- Board member of: Standard Capital Corporation, Ideal Chemicals, Universal Pictures Corp., Curtiss-Wright, Aqueduct Racetrack
- Spouse(s): Florence Hopkins, Katherine McCutcheon Abbott, Katherine Andrea Parker Berens
- Children: 1
- Parent(s): John Elliot Cowdin & Gertrude Cheever

John Cheever Cowdin (March 17, 1889 – September 16, 1960) was an American financier and polo champion who was a head of Universal Pictures, Standard Capital Corporation of New York City, and was chairman of Ideal Chemicals.

== Biography ==
Known as J. Cheever Cowdin, he was born in New York City on March 17, 1889, to John Elliott Cowdin and Gertrude Cheever.

In 1936, Cowdin's Standard Capital was part of the lending group who had to exercise their rights to the shares held as loan collateral of the financially strapped Universal Pictures Corp. from Carl Laemmle. Cowdin would serve as Universal's President and Chairman of its Board of Directors until 1946. Comedian Groucho Marx played a lawyer based on Cowdin in the 1939 film ‘At the Circus’. The character was named “J. Cheever Loophole”. A director of Curtiss-Wright, Cowdin was considered a leader in aviation financing, notably associated with fellow financier George Newell Armsby in the investment house of Blair & Co., which merged with BancAmerica to form Bancamerica-Blair in 1931. Through Armsby, Cowdin was associated with aviation pioneer (and friend of Amelia Earhart) Floyd Odlum.

Cowdin served as chairman of the Committee on Government Finance of the National Association of Manufacturers.

Cowdin was married three times in the course of his life. He married his first wife, Florence Hopkins, in 1912; they divorced in 1926. Their union produced a son, John Cheever Cowdin Jr. who in 1946 committed suicide at age 33 while in Nassau, Bahamas. According to The New York Times, Cowdin later married Katherine Andrea Parker Berens on December 30, 1941, in Yuma, Arizona. As a prominent American, the TIME magazine reported Cowdin's 1929 marriage to Manhattan socialite divorcee, Mrs. Katherine McCutcheon Abbott, in Bristol, Maine, during a cruise on his yacht, Surf.

He died on September 16, 1960.

== Equine sportsman ==
J. Cheever Cowdin served as president of Aqueduct Racetrack in Queens, New York. In 1941, the track renamed its Junior Champion Stakes Thoroughbred horse race to the Cowdin Stakes in his honor.

He was termed by Esquire Magazine not only one of the best-dressed men of his era, but "one of the Big Four of polo from the time of the great Tommy Hitchcock." The International Polo Club Palm Beach lists him on a 1927 team with W. Averell Harriman and Tommy Hitchcock. He also played in 1925
