= John Elliot Cowdin =

American polo player (1858–1941)

- Born: March 22, 1858; Boston, Massachusetts
- Died: January 7, 1941; New York City, New York & East Norwich, Connecticut
- Education: Harvard University
- Occupation: Silk merchant
- Spouse(s): Gertrude Cheever (d. 1908), Madeline Knowlton (d. 1950)
- Children: Ethel, Elliott Channing Cowdin, John Cheever
- Parent(s): Elliot Christopher Cowdin; Sarah Katharine Waldron

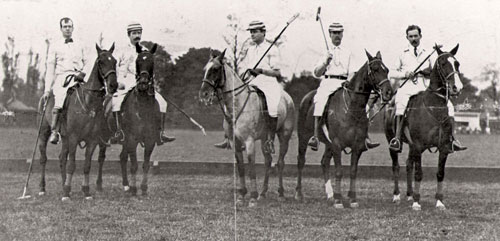
Rodolphe Louis Agassiz, James Montaudevert Waterbury Jr., John Elliott Cowdin, Lawrence Waterbury and Foxhall P. Keene in 1902 for the International Polo Cup

John Elliot Cowdin (March 22, 1858 – January 7, 1941) was an American polo player.

== Early life and career ==
Cowdin was born on March 22, 1858, to Elliot Christopher Cowdin and Sarah Katharine Waldron. His father was a prominent New York businessman and a member of the 100th New York State Legislature.

Cowdin played for the Rockaway Polo Club. He won the 1902 International Polo Cup and the first U.S. Open Polo Championship in 1904. He also won the Association and Added Cups, the Governor's Challenge Cup and the Senior Championship in 1896, 1899, 1902 and 1903.

His wife died on May 3, 1908, after a short illness while in Paris, France.

He married Gertrude Cheever with whom he had a daughter and two sons. In 1912, his second marriage was to Madeleine Knowlton.

He died on January 7, 1941.

== Legacy ==
He was inducted into the Museum of Polo and Hall of Fame in 2007. One of his sons, John Cheever Cowdin, was also a top level polo player.
