= James P. Wickersham =

American author and educator (1825–1891)

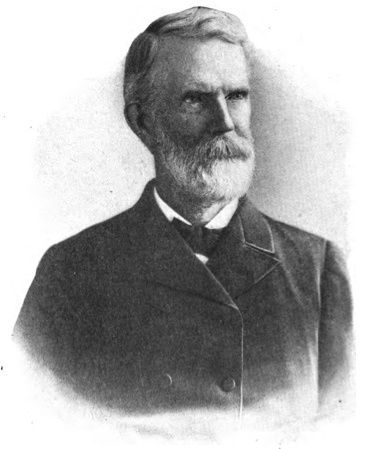

United States Chargé d'Affaires in Denmark
- In office 1882
- President: Chester A. Arthur
- Preceded by: Charles Payson
- Succeeded by: Wickham Hoffman

Personal details
- Born: March 5, 1825 Chester County, Pennsylvania, United States
- Died: March 25, 1891 (aged 66)
- Education: Unionville Academy

Military service
- Years of service: 1863
- Battles/wars: Gettysburg campaign

James Pyle Wickersham (March 5, 1825 – March 25, 1891) was an American educator and author in the Commonwealth of Pennsylvania. He also served as the US Chargé d'Affaires in Denmark in 1882.

== Biography ==
Wickersham was born in Chester County, Pennsylvania. He was of the fifth generation in direct descent from Thomas Wickersham, who in 1701 settled on a 1,000-acre tract of land in Chester County that had been deeded by William Penn in 1682 to his father-in-law, Anthony Killingbeck. The Wickersham family came from the parish of Bolney, county of Sussex, England. Wickersham received a good education in the public schools and at Unionville Academy, near his birthplace. When he was sixteen years old he was a teacher in a public school, and in 1845 he became principal of the Marietta (Pa.) academy. He was the first county superintendent of Lancaster County in 1854, and in 1855 he opened the Normal School at Millersville, Pa., which in 1859 became the first state normal school in Pennsylvania. In 1866 he was appointed state superintendent of public instruction, and held that post for nearly fifteen years. He assisted in the organization of the Lancaster county educational association, and became its second president in 1863. He helped to organize the Pennsylvania State Teacher's Association, was its fourth president in 1855, assisted at the organization of the National Educational Association, and was its seventh president in 1865. He was twice elected president of the National Department of School Superintendents.

In 1863 he raised a regiment of soldiers for three months' service, and commanded it during the Gettysburg Campaign. Lafayette College gave him the degree of LL.D. in 1871. In 1882 he was appointed U.S. minister to Denmark. He wrote on educational subjects for magazines and newspapers. For ten years (1871–81) he was editor of the Pennsylvania School Journal. His School Economy (Philadelphia. 1864) and Methods of Instruction (1865) have been translated into the Spanish, French, and Japanese languages. His most elaborate work is the History of Education in Pennsylvania (1886).

== Notes ==
Diplomatic posts
Preceded by Charles Payson	United States Chargé d’Affaires to Denmark; June 13, 1882 – August 21, 1882	Succeeded by J. P. Wickersham
Preceded by J. P. Wickersham	United States Minister Resident/Consul General to Denmark; August 21, 1882 – September 8, 1882	Succeeded by Wickham Hoffman
