= Independence of the Maldives =

Independence from the British empire territory over in the Maldives

Independence of the Maldive Islands
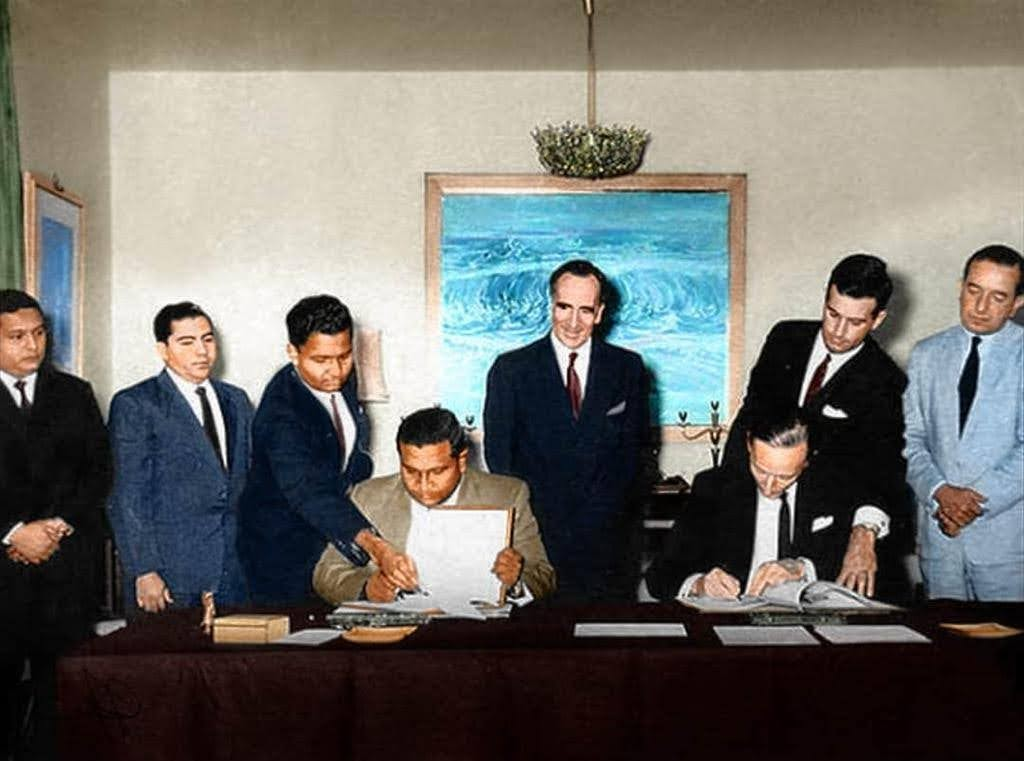
- Prime Minister Ibrahim Nasir signs independence agreement with the British
- Signed: July 26, 1965
- Location: Westminster House, Colombo, Dominion of Ceylon
- Ratified: July 26, 1965
- Signatories: Ibrahim Nasir; Michael Walker
- Language: English

The Maldives gained its independence from the United Kingdom, under an agreement signed with United Kingdom on July 26, 1965, after 78 years as a British protectorate.

In accordance with the broader British policy of decolonization, an agreement was formalized on 26 July 1965 in Ceylon. The agreement was signed by Ibrahim Nasir Rannabandeyri Kilegefan, Prime Minister of the Maldive Islands, representing the King of the Maldives, and Sir Michael Walker, British Ambassador-designate to the Maldive Islands, representing Queen Elizabeth II. This marked the conclusion of British responsibility for the defense and external affairs of the Maldives. With this agreement, the islands attained complete political independence. The ceremony took place at the British High Commissioner's Residence in Colombo.

The British expelled the Dutch from Ceylon and included the Maldives as a nominal British protectorate in 1796. During the reign of Queen Victoria in 1887, the Maldivian Sultan, Muhammad Mueenuddeen II officially accepted British protectorate in the Maldives. While the Maldives was a British protectorate, the Maldivian Sultan's powers were taken over by the chief minister and the prime minister.

== Independence ==
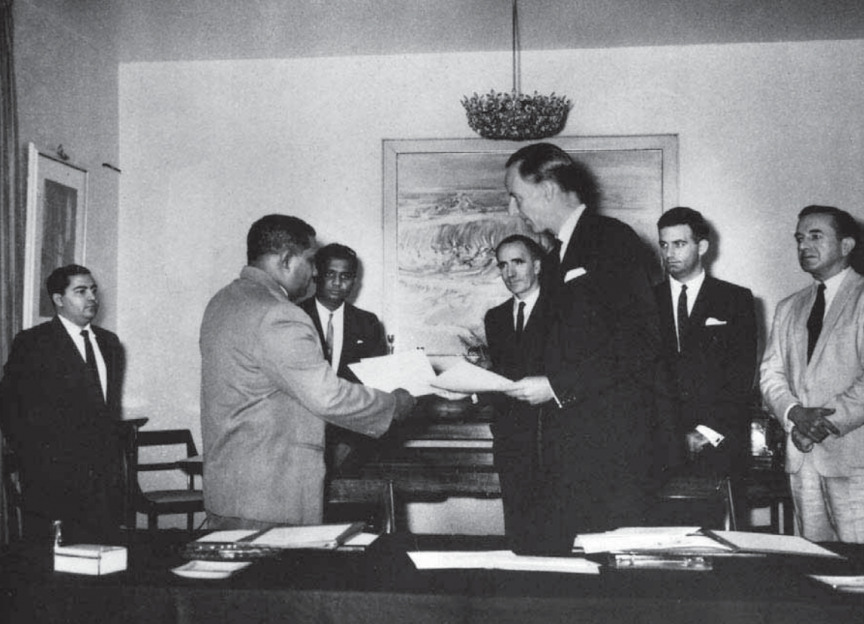
Prime Minister Ibrahim Nasir signs independence agreement with the British on the Westminster House, Colombo, Ceylon.

On July 26, 1965, the Maldives achieved independence through an agreement signed with the United Kingdom, The Sultanate of the Maldive Islands gained independence from British colonial rule on July 26, 1965. The agreement was signed in the morning of July 26, 1965, at Colombo in the Dominion of Ceylon.

The agreement was reached following discussions between the Maldives' representative in the Dominion of Ceylon (now Sri Lanka), Abdul Sattar Moosa Didi, and Sir Humphrey Arthington-Davy, the British representative.

The Maldives was under the protection of the British, however, then–Prime Minister Nasir was steadfast in his approach that he would not give even an inch to the British. Resulting in the British finally conceding defeat and agreeing to hold talks of independence with the Maldivians. The talks began on August 12, 1964, in Ceylon.

The British later proposed an independence agreement, prompting Prime Minister Nasir to liaise with his envoy in Ceylon, Abdul Sattar Moosa Didi, regarding necessary amendments. Serving as the intermediary and negotiator on behalf of Prime Minister Nasir, Mr. Didi facilitated discussions with the British. Ultimately, these deliberations led to an agreement satisfactory to both parties, thus finalizing the terms of independence.

== Protectorate overview ==
=== 1796–1965, protectorate ===
In the 1790s, as the British East India Company conducted trade voyages, expediting trade routes was imperative. To facilitate this, the British Empire's government dispatched the captain of the East India Company's Bombay Marine to chart the seas surrounding the Maldive Islands.

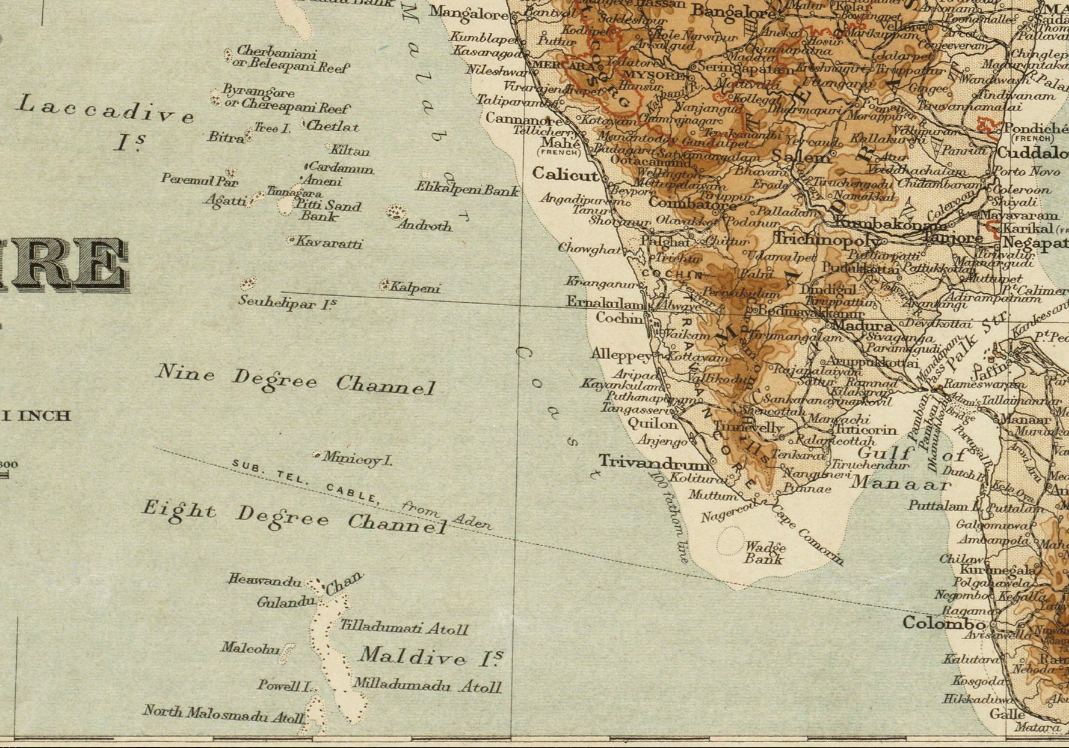
The British Map of the Maldive Islands (1920)

On February 22, 1887, British officials embarked on a visit to the Maldive Islands with the objective of assessing the prevailing situation in the country. Following a thorough gathering of information concerning various aspects of the nation, the British authorities conveyed to the Maldivian Sultan their perspective that the country would benefit from becoming a British protectorate. This proposition was made in consideration of geopolitical factors and the perceived advantages that such a status could offer the Maldives in terms of stability, security, and potential economic development.

Britain got involved with the Maldives as a result of domestic disturbances which targeted the settler community of Bora merchants, who were British subjects in the 1860s. Rivalry between two dominant families, the Athireege clan and the Kakaage clan, was resolved with the former winning the favour of the British authorities in Ceylon. The status of Maldives as a British protectorate was officially recorded in an 1887 agreement.

Sultan Muhammad Mueenuddeen II was forced to sign the agreement. On 16 December 1887, the Sultan of the Maldives signed a contract with the British Governor of Ceylon turning the Maldives into a British protected state, thus giving up the islands' sovereignty in matters of foreign policy, but retaining internal self-government. The British government promised military protection and non-interference in local administration, which continued to be regulated by Muslim traditional institutions, in exchange for an annual tribute.

=== World War II ===
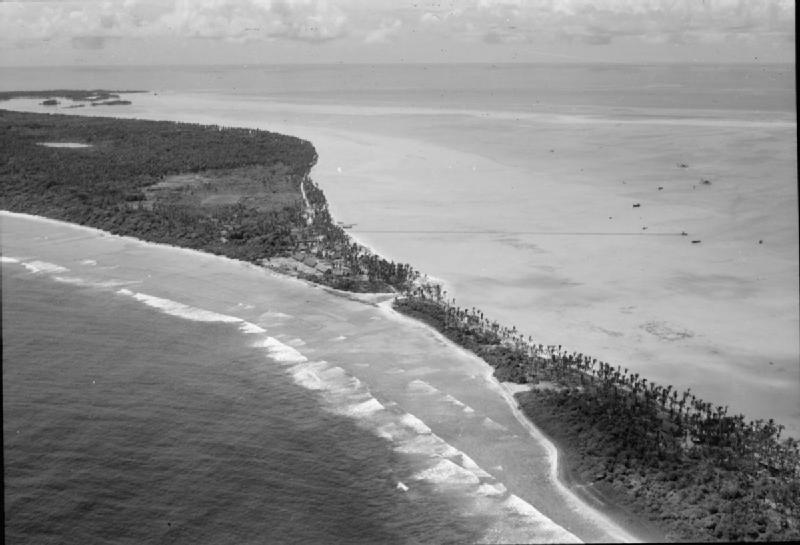
RAF Gan, 1945

Amidst the tumult of the Second World War, the British Empire strategically established RAF Gan, a Royal Air Force station, on Gan Island in Addu Atoll. The island, now known as Gan International Airport, served as a crucial military outpost during the war. The strategic significance of Gan Island lay in its location, providing a strategic vantage point in the Indian Ocean region. RAF Gan played a pivotal role as a refueling and maintenance station for Allied aircraft, facilitating crucial air operations and supply routes in the theater of war. The establishment of RAF Gan underscored the British Empire's efforts to bolster its military presence in key regions, ensuring the defense of its interests and allies amidst the global conflict. This military installation not only contributed to Allied efforts during the war but also left a lasting legacy in the development and infrastructure of the Maldives.

During the reign of Sultan Muhammed Fareed Didi, prime minister Ibrahim Faamudheyri Kilegefaan orchestrated a clandestine agreement with the British Empire, wherein Gan Island was leased to them for a duration of 100 years.

Ibrahim Nasir opposed Ibrahim Faamudheyri Kilegefaan's decision to lease Gan Island to the British for a century. However, due to health issues, Kilegefaan resigned as Prime Minister, paving the way for Nasir to assume the position. Nasir's ascent to power concerned the people of Addu Atoll, who felt marginalized by the government in Malé, which they perceived as authoritarian. Addu Atoll residents feared losing the benefits and opportunities provided by the British presence, known as the "ran zamaaan" or golden years. These included jobs and services that had been extended to the people of Addu Atoll. Consequently, there were aspirations among the Addu people to establish a new republic, independent from the central government, to safeguard their interests and autonomy.

On January 1, 1959, the United Suvadive Republic emerged, marking a significant rupture in the territorial integrity of the Maldives. This breakaway entity encompassed three atolls: Huvadhoo, Fuvahmulah, and Addu. The formation of the United Suvadive Republic represented a pivotal moment in Maldivian history, reflecting simmering tensions and grievances within these atolls regarding governance and autonomy. However, this period of separation was relatively short-lived, as the republic was dissolved in 1963, resulting in its reintegration with the Maldives. The decision to dissolve the United Suvadive Republic and reunite with the Maldives was likely influenced by a variety of factors, including political, economic, and strategic considerations. This event left a lasting imprint on the collective memory of the Maldives, serving as a reminder of the complexities and challenges inherent in maintaining national unity and cohesion amidst diverse regional interests and identities.

== Independence Day ==
Maldives Independence Day, celebrated on July 26, marks the day the country gained freedom from British protection in 1965. It is a day of national pride, marked by flag hoisting ceremonies, parades, and cultural performances.
