= Philip K. Crowe =

American diplomat and writer (1908–1976)

Philip K. Crove
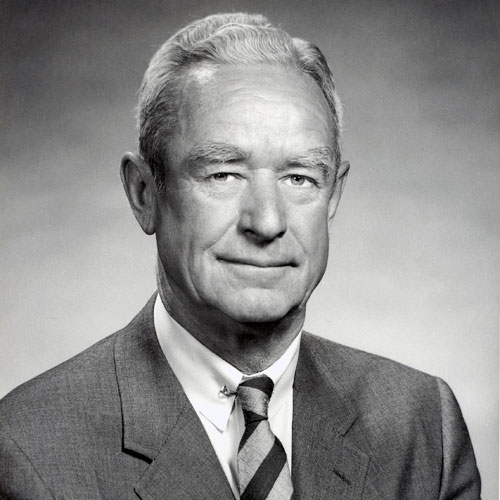

United States Ambassador to Ceylon
- In office September 19, 1953 – September 27, 1956
- President: Dwight D. Eisenhower
- Preceded by: Maxwell Henry Gluck
- Succeeded by: Lampton Berry

United States Ambassador to South Africa
- In office April 22, 1959 – April 6, 1961
- President: Dwight D. Eisenhower
- Preceded by: Henry A. Byroade
- Succeeded by: Joseph C. Satterthwaite

United States Ambassador to Norway
- In office June 23, 1969 – August 31, 1973
- President: Richard Nixon
- Preceded by: Margaret Joy Tibbetts
- Succeeded by: Thomas Ryan Byrne

United States Ambassador to Denmark
- In office September 13, 1973 – September 27, 1975
- President: Richard Nixon
- Preceded by: Fred J. Russell
- Succeeded by: John Gunther Dean

Personal details
- Born: Philip Kingsland Crowe; January 7, 1908 New York City, U.S.
- Died: November 16, 1976 (aged 68) Washington, D.C., U.S.
- Spouse: Suzanne Noregaard (m. 1936)
- Children: 1

Philip Kingsland Crowe (January 7, 1908 – November 16, 1976) was an American journalist, writer, intelligence officer and diplomat.

== Career ==
Crowe was a journalist at the New York Evening Post, traveled in French Indochina and ran big game hunt before working on ads in the magazines Life and Fortune. During World War II, he worked in the Office of Strategic Services where he was the secret intelligence officer in charge of an area, covering China, Burma and India.

=== Diplomat ===
He joined the U.S. Foreign Service in 1948. Crowe was U.S. Ambassador to Ceylon from 1953 to 1958 and in South Africa from 1959 to 1961. In 1969, he was appointed Ambassador to Norway and served until August 31, 1973. Following the ambassador period in Norway, Crowe was ambassador in Denmark from 1973 to 1975.

=== Author ===
He published several books on outdoor recreation, ethic conservation and his time as a diplomat.

== Awards ==
- Bronze star, the Order of Yun-Hui from the Republic of China
- Grand Cross, Order of St. Olav from Norway
- Officer in the French Legion of Honor from France

Diplomatic posts
Preceded by Maxwell Henry Gluck	U.S. Ambassador to Ceylon; 1953–1956	Succeeded by Lampton Berry
Preceded by Henry A. Byroade	U.S. Ambassador to South Africa; 1959-1961	Succeeded by Joseph C. Satterthwaite
Preceded by Margaret Joy Tibbetts	U.S. Ambassador to Norway; 1969–1973	Succeeded by Thomas Ryan Byrne
Preceded by Fred J. Russell	U.S. Ambassador to Denmark; 1973–1975	Succeeded by John Gunther Dean
