= Rasmus B. Anderson =

American diplomat (1846–1936)

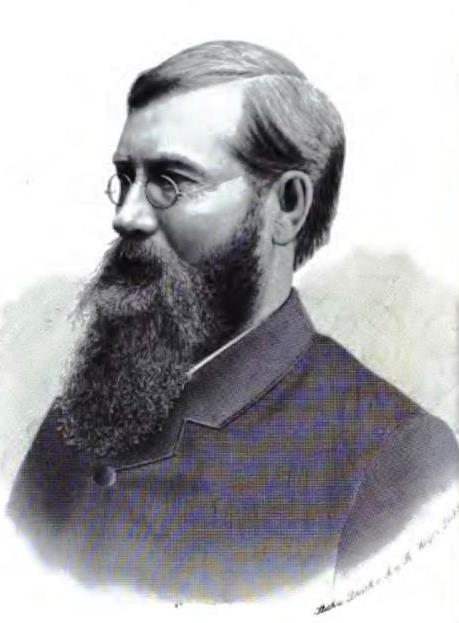
Rasmus Bjørn Anderson

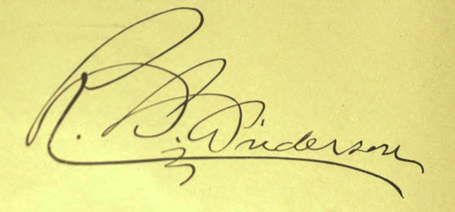
signature

Rasmus Bjørn Anderson (January 12, 1846 – March 2, 1936) was an American author, professor, editor, businessman and diplomat. He brought to popular attention the fact that Viking explorers were the first Europeans to arrive in the New World and was the originator of Leif Erikson Day.

== Life and career ==
Anderson was born in the Town of Albion in Dane County, Wisconsin and grew up in Koshkoning. His parents Bjørn Anderson Kvelve (1801–1850) and Abel Cathrine von Krogh (1809–1885) were immigrants from Sandeid / Vikedal in Ryfylke in the county of Rogaland, Norway. His mother also had Danish, Swedish, German, Dutch, and Flemish ancestry. His parents were part of a small band of Quaker sympathizers who organized a Norwegian emigration to America in 1836. His father died of cholera when Anderson was four years old.

Anderson was a graduate of Luther College and the University of Wisconsin. He was a professor at the University of Wisconsin–Madison from 1867 to 1883. While there, he was the founding head of the Department of Scandinavian Studies, the oldest such department in an American university. He also persuaded Norwegian violinist Ole Bull to give a concert for the benefit of a projected Norwegian language library at the university. Ole Bull subsequently paid Anderson's expenses for a trip to Norway to purchase books for the library.

Rasmus B. Anderson founded a publication company, the Norrœna Society, which focused on republishing translations of texts devoted to "the History and Romance of Northern Europe". Anderson was the author of a number of books with Scandinavian themes. He also did a series of translations from Scandinavian languages, most notably the writings of Norwegian novelist Bjørnstjerne Bjørnson. From 1905 to 1907, Rasmus Anderson acted as editor-in-chief of the Norrœna Library.

From 1885 to 1889, Anderson served as the United States Ambassador to Denmark. After his return to the U.S. in 1889, he was editor (1898–1922) of the Norwegian language weekly, Amerika. He also served as president of the Wisconsin Life Insurance Co. from 1895 to 1922.

Anderson's book America Not Discovered by Columbus helped popularize the now familiar fact that Norse explorers were the first Europeans in the New World. Anderson was the originator of the movement to honor Leif Erikson with a holiday in the United States. Through efforts he started and led, Leif Erikson Day became an official observance in his native Wisconsin and other US states. Decades after Anderson's death, it first became a federal observance by presidential proclamation in 1964.

== Personal life ==
In 1868, he married Bertha Karina Olson (1848–1922). They were the parents of five children. His wife died in 1922. Anderson spent the last years of his life in their home in Madison, where he died in 1936. He was buried at Lake Ripley Cemetery in Cambridge, Wisconsin.

== Selected works ==
- Julegave (1872)
- "The Scandinavian Languages" (1873)
- Den norske maalsag (1874)
- America Not Discovered by Columbus (1874)
- Norse Mythology (1875)
- Viking Tales of the North (1877)
- The Younger Edda (1880)
- a translation of Dr. F. W. Horns "History of the Literature of the Scandinavian North" (1885)
- Amerikas første Opdagelse (1886)
- First Chapter of Norwegian Immigration, 1821–1840 (1895)
- Bygdejævning (1903)
- The Norse Discovery of America (1907)
- Life Story of Rasmus B. Anderson (1915, with Albert O. Barton)
- Cleng Peerson og sluppen "Restaurationen" (1925)
- The Heimskringla or The Saga of the Norse Kings (1889, rev. 2nd ed. of Samuel Laing, The Norse Kings)

Diplomatic posts
Preceded by Wickham Hoffman	U.S. Ambassador to Denmark; 1885–1889; As Minister Resident/Consul General	Succeeded by John A. Enander
