= Jefferson House, Colombo =

Jefferson House
- Location within Colombo Municipality

General information
- Location: 94 Horton Place, Colombo 7, Sri Lanka
- Coordinates: 6°54′41.4″N 79°52′13.1″E
- Owner: United States Government

Jefferson House is the official ambassadorial residence for the Ambassador of the United States to Sri Lanka and the Maldives, located in Cinnamon Gardens, a suburb of Colombo.

It was built in 1914 and is an example of early 20th-century British colonial architecture. It was once the home of Hon. Justice Vincent M. Fernando, Judge of the Supreme Court of Ceylon. On 28 June 1948, upon establishment of formal diplomatic relations between America and Ceylon, it was purchased by the Government of the United States, for the use of its Ambassador to Ceylon. The building was named after the third President of the United States, Thomas Jefferson. The first ambassador to reside at the premises was Felix Cole, who served from 8 April 1948 to 30 October 1949.

The two-storey residence is located on 0.61 ha (1.5 acres) of land. The ground floor contains a reception hall, dining room (with seating for 24 people), two drawing/reception rooms, a guest bedroom, guest bathrooms. The upstairs has four bedrooms, three bathrooms, and a sitting room. The kitchen, servants' quarters, laundry, and a double garage are located in a one-storey wing extending to the rear.

== See also ==
- Old United States Chancery, Colombo
- Westminster House
- India House
