= Embassy of the United States, Copenhagen =

Diplomatic mission

United States Embassy in Copenhagen

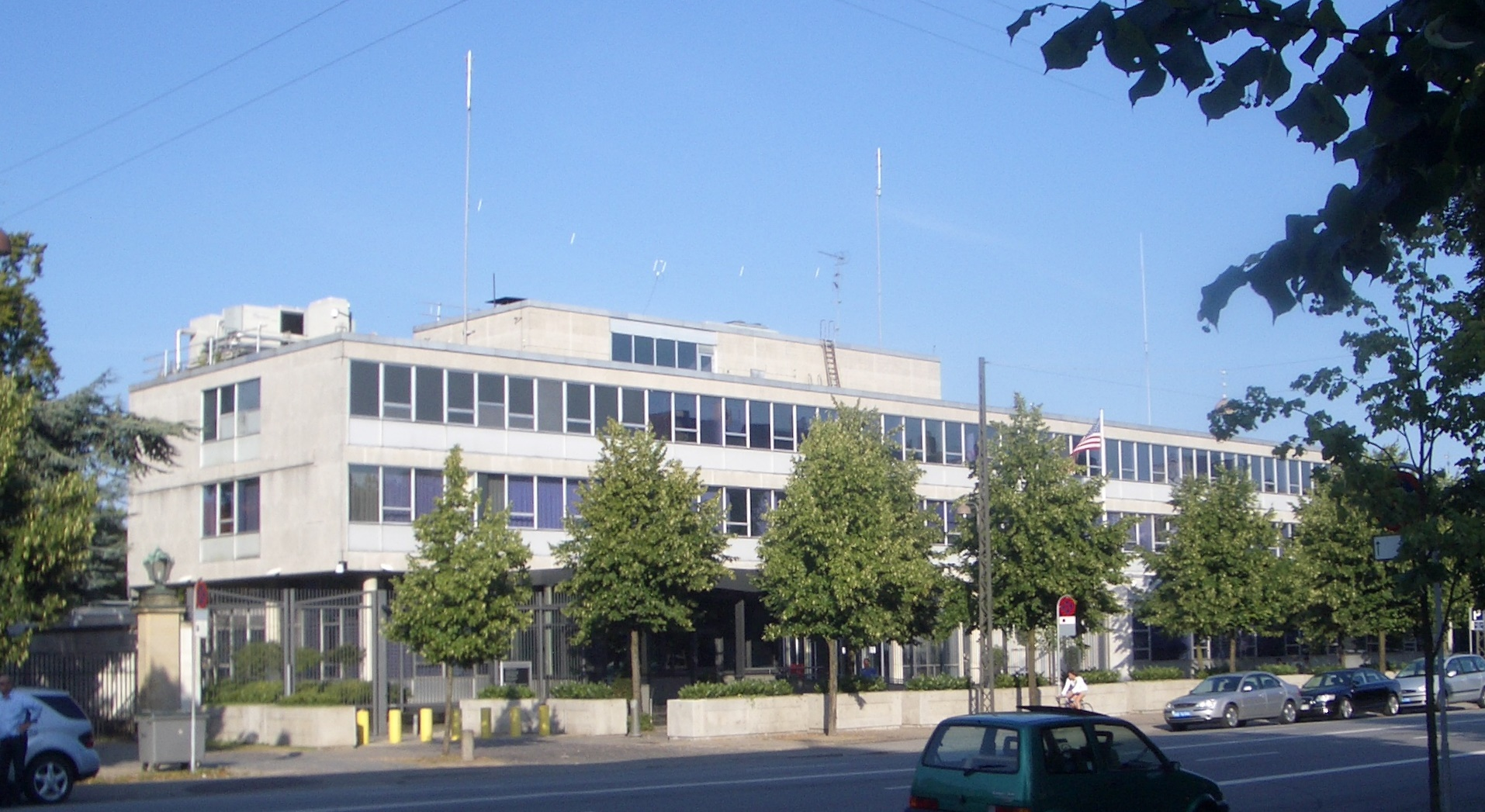
- U.S. Embassy building in Copenhagen
- Location: Copenhagen
- Address: Dag Hammarskjölds Allé 24
- Coordinates: 55°41′41″N 12°34′59″E
- Ambassador: Ken Howery

The Embassy of the United States to the Kingdom of Denmark is the diplomatic mission of the United States in Denmark. The building is located on Dag Hammarskjölds Allé, in Indre Østerbro, Copenhagen, and it was opened in May 1954. The embassy also oversees American interests in Greenland. On 10 June 2020, the United States reopened its consulate in Nuuk, Greenland.

== History ==
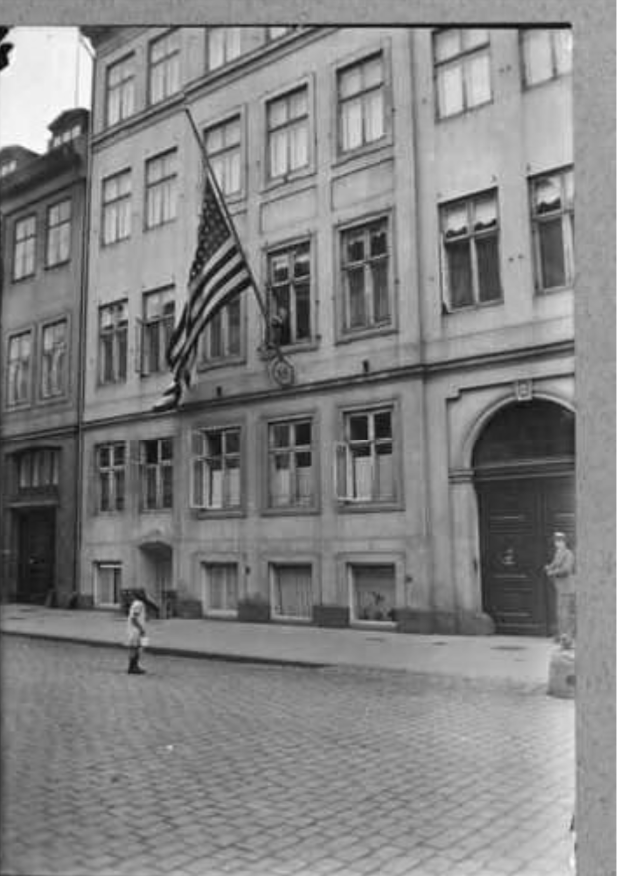
The American diplomatic mission at Amaliegade 8 in 1924

Formal relations between the two countries began in 1801, and the first American legation in the Kingdom opened in 1827. Since then, the American diplomatic mission has remained opened and functioning in Copenhagen except between 1941 and 1945 during World War II. The diplomatic mission was formerly based at Amaliegade 8.

The legation was raised to embassy status shortly after the war, in 1947, with the arrival of Ambassador Josiah Marvel, Jr.

== Buildings ==
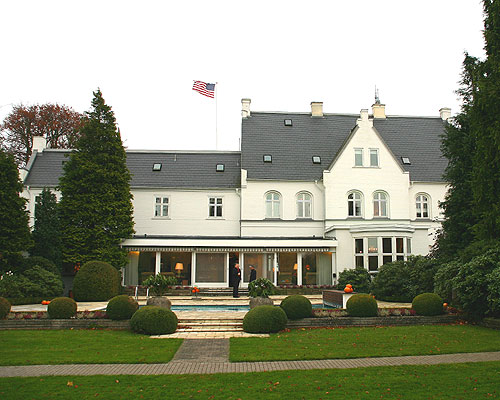
Rydhave

The current building, located in central Copenhagen was designed by two American architects, Ralph Rapson of MIT and John Van der Muelen of the University of Chicago. Their design was submitted in 1951 and the new chancery formally opened on May 27, 1954. The modernist design divided contemporary critics, with some regarding it as "sterile" and "melancholy” while others praised its interiors and upheld it as both aesthetically pleasing and functional. The government of Denmark awarded it the 1955 Danish Medal for Good Design.

The ambassador resides at Rydhave in Skovshoved a few miles north of the city. The house is perched on a high hill, overlooking the Øresund.

== Embassy sections ==
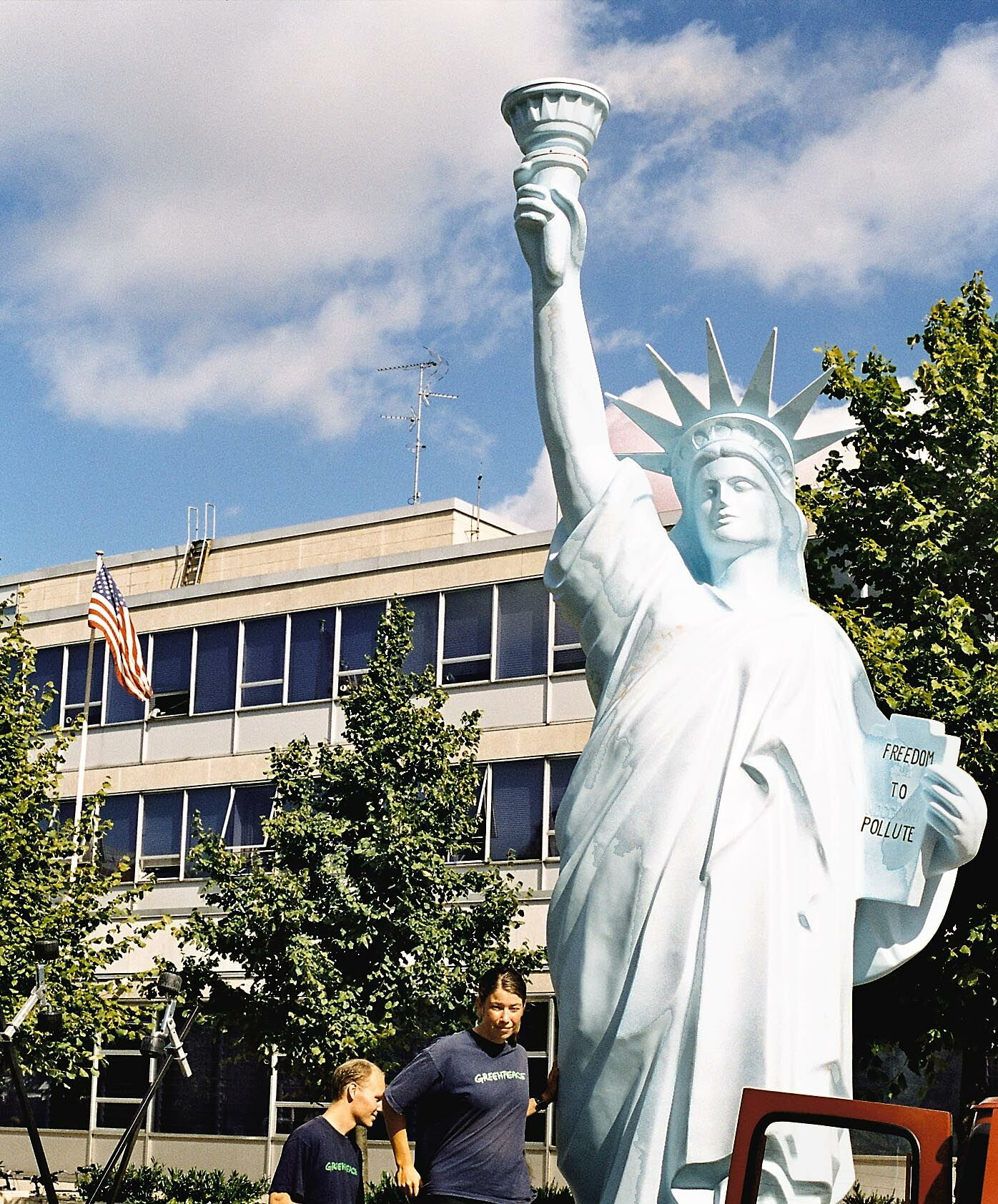
Environmentalist protesters march in front of the embassy

- Consular Section
  - American Citizen Services
  - Visa Services
- United States Commercial Service
- Defense Attaché
- Environmental Office
  - Nordic/Baltic ESTH (Environment, Science, Technology and Health) Regional Hub
- U.S. Customs and Border Protection
- Public Affairs
- Office of Defense Cooperation
- Department of Homeland Security and Immigration Services
- Regional Security Office

== See also ==
- Denmark–United States relations
- U.S. Ambassador to Denmark
- Consulate General of the United States, Nuuk
