= Guilford Dudley (ambassador) =

American diplomat and businessman (1907–2002)

United States Ambassador to Denmark
- In office June 18, 1969 – November 2, 1971
- President: Richard Nixon
- Preceded by: Angier Biddle Duke
- Succeeded by: Fred J. Russell

Personal details
- Born: Guilford Dudley Jr. June 23, 1907 Nashville, Tennessee, U.S.
- Died: June 13, 2002 (aged 94) Nashville, Tennessee, U.S.
- Spouse: 3, including Jane Dudley
- Children: 2 sons, 1 daughter
- Parent(s): Guilford Dudley, Sr. Anne Dallas Dudley
- Relatives: Chris Dudley (grandson)
- Education: Vanderbilt University
- Occupation: Businessman, diplomat

Guilford Dudley Jr. (June 23, 1907 – June 13, 2002) was an American businessman and diplomat. He served as the United States Ambassador to Denmark under the Nixon Administration.

== Early life ==
Guilford was born on June 23, 1907, in Nashville, Tennessee. His father, Guilford Dudley, Sr., was a co-founder of the Life and Casualty Insurance Company of Tennessee. His mother, Anne Dallas Dudley, was an activist in the women's suffrage movement in the United States.

Guilford graduated from Vanderbilt University. During World War II, he served in the United States Navy.

== Career ==
Dudley began his career for the Life and Casualty Insurance Company in 1932. He served as its president from 1951 to 1968. Under his leadership, the company built the Life & Casualty Tower in Downtown Nashville in 1957. He merged the company with American General in 1968. It is now a subsidiary of the American International Group.

Guilford was the chairman of the finance committee of the Tennessee Republican Party. He was the finance manager on the presidential campaigns of Republican candidates Dwight Eisenhower, Richard Nixon and Gerald Ford, and he "served as an advisor to Ronald Reagan's 1980 transition team." He served as the United States Ambassador to Denmark from 1969 to 1971. He was awarded the Grand Cross of the Order of the Dannebrog.

== Personal life, death and legacy ==
Guilford was married three times; his third wife was Jane Anderson. They resided in Palm Beach, Florida, in a house he later sold to A. Alfred Taubman. Dudley had two sons and a daughter. He was a member of the Belle Meade Country Club in Belle Meade, Tennessee, and the Everglades Club and the Bath and Tennis Club in Palm Beach. He was active in his local community, advocating for causes such as the annual Iroquois Steeplechase.

Guilford died in Nashville, Tennessee, at 94. His funeral was held at the Christ Church Cathedral, and he was buried in Mount Olivet Cemetery. His grandson Chris Dudley was a professional basketball player and politician.

Diplomatic posts
Preceded by Angier Biddle Duke	United States Ambassador to Denmark; 1969–1971	Succeeded by Fred J. Russell
