= Walker Blaine =

American lawyer (1855–1890)

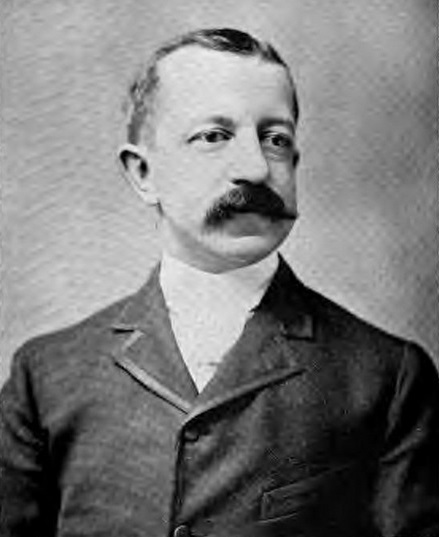

3rd Third Assistant Secretary of State
- In office July 1, 1881 – June 30, 1882
- President: James A. Garfield; Chester A. Arthur
- Preceded by: Charles Payson
- Succeeded by: Alvey A. Adee

Personal details
- Born: May 8, 1855 Augusta, Maine, U.S.
- Died: January 15, 1890 (aged 34) Washington, D.C., U.S.
- Resting place: Oak Hill Cemetery
- Party: Republican
- Parent(s): James G. Blaine; Harriet (Stanwood) Blaine
- Education: Yale University; Columbia University
- Occupation: Lawyer; Assistant Counsel of the United States for the Court of Commissioners of Alabama Claims (1882-1886); Solicitor of the Department of State (1889-1890)

Walker Blaine (May 8, 1855 – January 15, 1890) was an official in the United States Department of State.

== Biography ==
Walker Blaine was born in Augusta, Maine, on May 8, 1855, to James G. Blaine and Harriet (Stanwood) Blaine. In 1876, he graduated from Yale College, where he served on the third editorial board of The Yale Record and was a member of Skull and Bones. He then earned his law degree from Columbia Law School.

After law school, Blaine joined the law office of Senator Cushman Kellogg Davis (R–Minn.) in Saint Paul, Minnesota. In 1881, Blaine's father became the United States Secretary of State in the administration of President of the United States James A. Garfield. Blaine's father named him Third Assistant Secretary of State, with Blaine holding this office from July 1, 1881, until June 30, 1882. During his time as Third Assistant Secretary, Blaine and William Henry Trescot were sent on a special diplomatic mission to South America. Following the death of Garfield and the resignation of the older Blaine, President Chester A. Arthur appointed Walker Blaine assistant counsel of the United States for the Court of Commissioners of Alabama Claims. Blaine held this office until the court's abolition on January 1, 1886. He then moved to Chicago to practice law. In 1889, Blaine's father became Secretary of State for the second time (this time in the Benjamin Harrison administration) and James G. Blaine again secured a position for Walker Blaine in the United States Department of State, this time as Solicitor of the Department of State.

Walker Blaine died in Washington, D.C., unexpectedly on January 15, 1890, of pneumonia that followed a bout of influenza. He is buried at Oak Hill Cemetery in Washington.

Government offices
Preceded by Charles Payson	Third Assistant Secretary of State; July 1, 1881 – June 30, 1882	Succeeded by Alvey A. Adee
