= Old United States Chancery, Colombo =

American Center
- Location within Central Colombo
- Former names: Rickman House; Sri Rayma
- Alternative names: United States Chancery

General information
- Location: 44 Galle Road, Colombo, Sri Lanka
- Coordinates: 6.9191°N 79.8466°E
- Current tenants: USAid

The American Center or the former United States Chancery are currently used as the offices of USAid in Colombo, Sri Lanka. The building is located on Galle Road, Colombo.

== History ==
The building was originally built by J. H. Meedeniya Adigar, which he named Rickman House. It was the home of D. R. Wijewardena (the founder of the Lake House newspaper group), who married Meedeniya's eldest daughter Alice. The property is relatively unique as its land title, under the original old Dutch deed, extends down to the ocean, only one of a few such cases in Colombo.

In 1903 the building was purchased by Wijewardena's mother, Helena, who subsequently demolished the existing residence and rebuilt a new dwelling, Sri Ramya. The new dwelling was designed by Herbert Henry Reid. Wijewardena occupied the residence until her death in 1940. In May 1934, the Indian poet, Rabindranath Tagore and the Indian painter, Nandalal Bose, stayed at the house for a fortnight, when Tagore brought a troupe of Bengali dancers to Ceylon.

In 1951 the building was purchased by the Government of the United States to serve as the chancery of its Embassy in Sri Lanka. It functioned in that capacity until the United States Embassy moved to a new premises in 1984 and the building was transferred to USAid, for use as their offices.

== See also ==
- Jefferson House
