= Westminster House =

British diplomatic residence in Colombo, Sri Lanka

- Location within Colombo Municipality

General information
- Location: Wijerama Mawatha, Colombo, Sri Lanka
- Coordinates: 6.9066°N 79.8726°E

Westminster House, the official residence in Colombo for the British High Commissioner in Sri Lanka, is situated in Cinnamon Gardens, a suburb of Colombo.

In 1948 Ceylon became a dominion within the commonwealth and the British established a high commission that year. The High Commissioner was originally domiciled in a government bungalow, Four Furlongs, on Bauddhaloka Mawatha (formerly Bullers Road) in Cinnamon Gardens. In March 1950 that the Ceylonese government provided a 0.5 ha (1.2 acres) site for the High Commissioner's new residence, on a 99-year lease, on Wijerama Mawatha (formerly MacCarthy Road), in Cinnamon Gardens, however the lease was not formally signed until March 1952.

The building, a colonial style bungalow, with large gardens, was designed by the Ministry of Works in New Delhi, for an estimated cost of £40,000. Works on the residence commenced in July 1952 and it was completed in March 1954. Most of the furniture for the ground floor was designed, in a contemporary style, by Dennis Lennon. The residence was named after the Palace of Westminster. The final cost was £53,795, plus £12,000 for furnishings and equipment.

The offices of the High Commission occupied a six-storey office building, designed by Charles Kidby of the Ministry of Works, on a 1.6 ha (4.0 acres) site, on Galle Road in Colpetty. Construction of the office building commenced in April 1963, with the laying of a foundation stone by Sir Michael Walker, and opened in January 1966. In the late 1990s the British Government decided that the existing office of the High Commission was no longer fit for purpose and acquired a 0.8 ha (2.0 acres) site on Bauddhaloka Mawatha, from the Meteorological Department, adjacent to Westminster House. In 2001 the Scottish architectural practice, Richard Murphy Associates, in collaboration with local architect, Milroy Perera, was commissioned to design the new offices. The single-storey building has a central spine traversing the middle of the site with four wings leading off it on either side in a staggered arrangement, creating a series of small intimate courtyards, reflecting aspects of traditional Sri Lankan architecture. The building was formally opened in May 2008.

On 14 November 2013, King Charles celebrated his 65th birthday at Westminster House, whilst he was attending the 23rd Commonwealth Heads of Government Meeting in Sri Lanka as the Prince of Wales.

== See also ==
- Jefferson House
- India House
