= James M. Buchanan (diplomat) =

American politician (1803–1876)

James Madison Buchanan
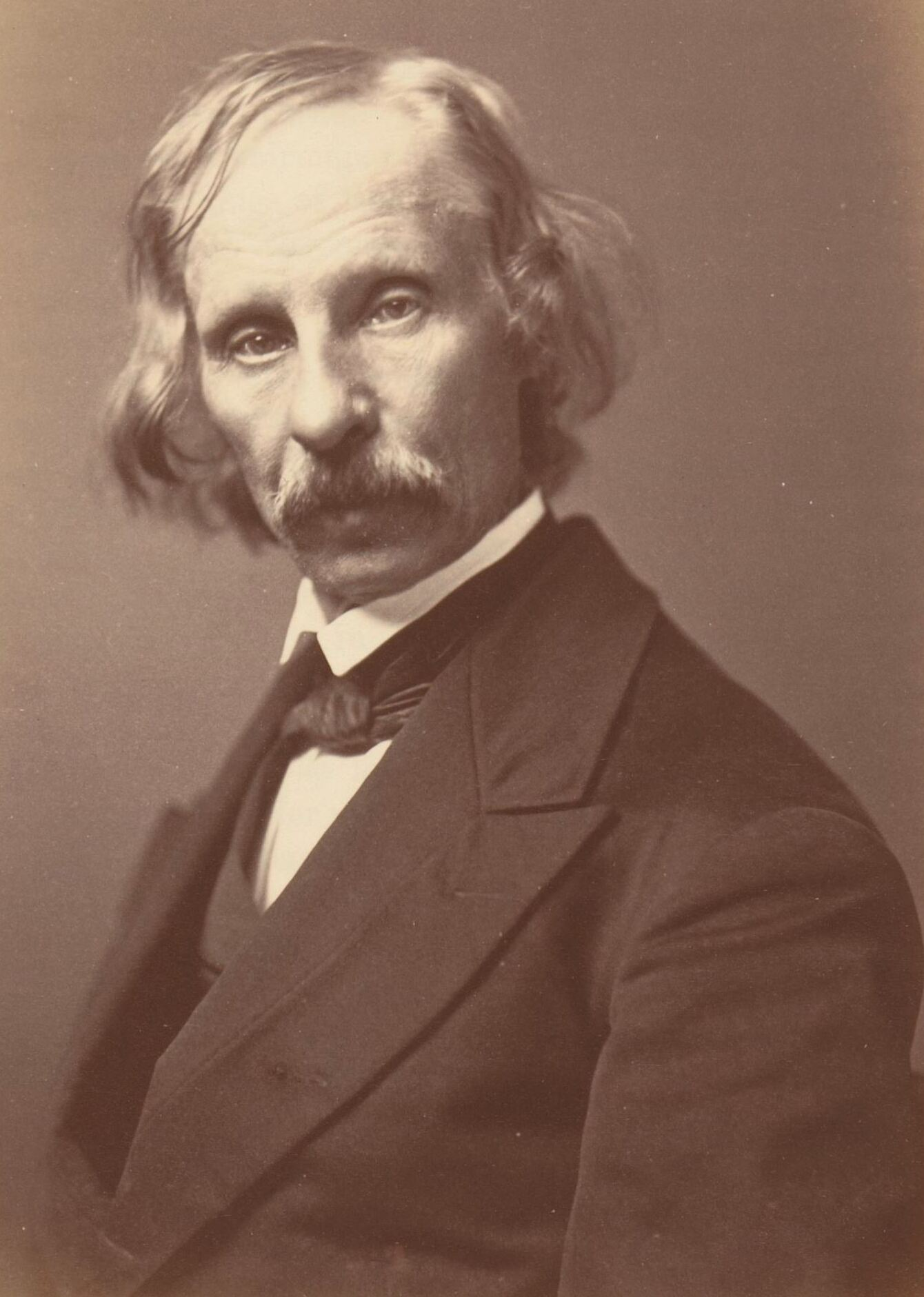
- Portrait of Buchanan

United States Minister to Denmark
- In office 1858–1861
- President: James Buchanan
- Preceded by: Henry Bedinger
- Succeeded by: Bradford R. Wood

Personal details
- Born: May 1803 Pikesville, Maryland, U.S.
- Died: August 23, 1876 (aged 73) Berkeley, West Virginia, U.S.
- Resting place: Green Mount Cemetery; Baltimore, Maryland, U.S.
- Party: Democratic-Republican, Democrat, Whig
- Spouse: Jane Ellen Carns
- Children: William; John Adams; James Jr.; Emily; John Rowan; Edmund; Rebecca; Harvey; Ellen
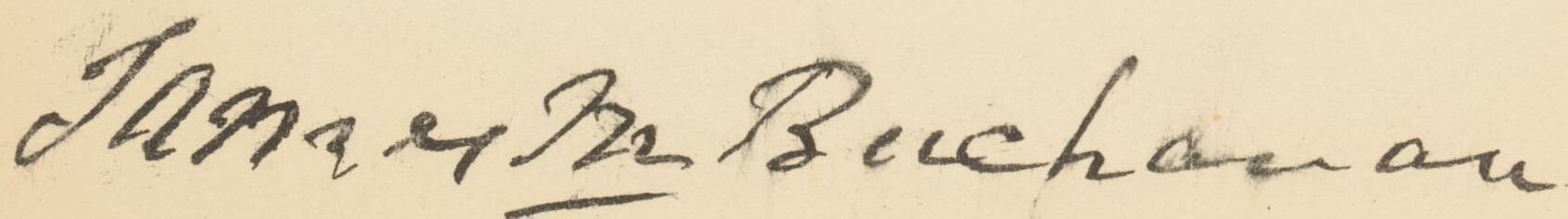
- Signature

James Madison Buchanan (May 1803 – August 23, 1876) was a Baltimore, Maryland jurist and diplomat.

== Early life ==
James Madison Buchanan was born in Pikesville, Maryland, in May 1803 (some sources indicate 1802). He was the son of William Buchanan (1748–1824) and Hephzibah (née Brown) Buchanan. During the American Revolutionary War, his father was a member of the committee of correspondence and was a registrar of wills for Baltimore county in 1778.

Through his father, he was a cousin of 15th President of the United States James Buchanan (1791–1868).

He attended Baltimore College and St. Mary's College of Baltimore, studied law with Hugh Davey Evans and Walter Dorsey, and became an attorney in Baltimore.

== Career ==
A Democratic-Republican, Buchanan served in the Maryland House of Delegates in 1826 & 1829. Later a Democrat, he campaigned for Andrew Jackson for president in 1824 and 1828, and attended numerous local and state party conventions as a Delegate.

In the 1830s, he joined the militia as an aide-de-camp to the Commander of the Baltimore City Guards. Buchanan became a Whig in the 1830s, but later returned to the Democratic party.

Buchanan served as Baltimore's postmaster for eight years during the administration of James K. Polk, and he was President of Maryland's 1850–1851 constitutional convention. In 1852 he was appointed as one of Maryland's Commissioners for resolving the state's boundary with Pennsylvania, and in 1855 he was appointed a Judge on Maryland's Circuit Court.

In 1856, Buchanan was a delegate to the Democratic National Convention, and supported his cousin James Buchanan for president. In 1858, President Buchanan nominated James M. Buchanan as Minister to Denmark succeeding Henry Bedinger. He served until 1861 when he was replaced by Bradford R. Wood.

=== Later career ===
After spending time touring Paris and Europe during the American Civil War, Buchanan returned to Baltimore and practiced law until his death.

== Personal life ==
Buchanan was married to Jane Ellen Carns. Together, they were the parents of:

- William Jefferson Buchanan (1833–1874), a Princeton lawyer and newspaper man.
- John Adams Buchanan (1835–1839), who died young.
- James Madison Buchanan Jr. (1837–1924), who married Sarah Ann Elizabeth McGaughy (1840–1893)
- Emily Rebecca Buchanan (1838–1844), who died young.
- John Rowan Buchanan (1841–1880)
- Edmund Key Buchanan (1843–1908)
- Rebecca Priscilla Buchanan (1847–1861), who died young.
- Harvey Buchanan (b. 1851)
- Ellen Elizabeth Buchanan (1853–1859), who died young.

== Death and burial ==
Buchanan died in Berkeley, West Virginia, on August 23, 1876, and was buried in Baltimore's Green Mount Cemetery. (One source indicate that he died in Baltimore.)

Diplomatic posts
Preceded by Henry Bedinger	U.S. Minister to Denmark; 1858–1861	Succeeded by Bradford R. Wood
