= Superintendent (education) =

Administrator in charge of multiple schools

In the American education system, a superintendent or superintendent of schools is an administrator of a school district, a local government body overseeing public schools. All school principals in a respective school district report to the superintendent.

The role and powers of the superintendent vary among areas according to Sharp and Walter, a popularly held opinion is that "the most important role of the board of education is to hire its superintendent."

== History ==
The first education laws in the United States were enacted in the colonial era, when various New England colonies passed ordinances directing towns "to choose men to manage the important affairs of learning, such as deciding local taxes, hiring teachers, setting wages, and determining the length of the school year." The persons responsible were frequently selectmen who had additional government responsibilities. Boston established America's first permanent school committee in 1721; this became America's first school board. Massachusetts and some other regions retain the term school committee, but school board and board of education are the more common terms nationwide, and a variety of other labels have been used. In 1986, about 95 percent of school board members were elected, with the rest appointed by town boards, mayors, or others.

In early America, school board members handled the day-to-day administration of schools without the need for a superintendent. By the 1830s, however, the increasing numbers of students, as well as the consolidation of one-room schoolhouses into larger districts, led districts to begin appointing the first superintendents. Buffalo, New York, became the first location to appoint a superintendent, on June 9, 1837, with Louisville, Kentucky, following on July 31 of the same year. Large cities, which had the greatest administrative needs, were the first to appoint superintendents, but as schools consolidated into districts, the practice of appointing a superintendent became more popular.

A major event in the history of education in the United States was the "Kalamazoo school case" (Stuart v. School District No. 1 of the Village of Kalamazoo). In 1858, Kalamazoo, Michigan established its first high school, and the following year, the Michigan Legislature enacted legislature authorizing the election of school districts and the establishment of high schools funded by local taxes. In January 1873, three Kalamazoo property owners filed a lawsuit challenging the law. In a unanimous decision of the Michigan Supreme Court in 1874 written by the prominent Justice Thomas M. Cooley, the law was upheld. This decision led to a dramatic increase in the number of high schools operating both in Michigan and other states, which led to an increase in the number of superintendents.

Early superintendents tended to focus on instruction, with "overall fiscal affairs, school building construction, and maintenance" remaining under school district control, becoming normal responsibilities of superintendents only in the early twentieth century. By the early twentieth century, superintendents emphasized business affairs. Important leaders in American education at the time were George D. Strayer, Ellwood P. Cubberley, and Edward C. Elliott, who all wrote doctoral dissertations on education finance at Columbia University in the first decade of the 20th century. Cubberley served as superintendent in San Diego and later taught at Stanford University, Strayer taught at Teachers College, Columbia University, and Elliott taught at the University of Wisconsin.

In 1911, the idea of the superintendent as a separate professional emerged. The emergence of the superintendency was linked to the adoption of a business organizational model in education. Beginning in 1914, Columbia and other universities began to teach courses on educational administration, including school finance, business methods, budgeting, and organization. Cubberley wrote a book in 1916 on this "New Profession" and emphasized the role of superintendent as chief executive of schools. In 1914, the US Commissioner of Education wrote that the US was moving "unmistakably in the direction of a profession of educational administration as distinct from teaching." By 1925, journals and books on educational administration had adopted a view of superintendents as executives, as Cubberley had advocated.

== See also ==
- CEO of public schools
- Chancellor (education)
- Dean (education)
- National Association of School Superintendents
- Provost (education)
- Principal (academia)
- Schoolmaster
- State education agency
- Vice-principal
