= Felix Cole =

American diplomat

1st United States Ambassador to Ceylon
- In office August 3, 1949 – October 30, 1949
- Succeeded by: Joseph C. Satterthwaite

United States Ambassador to Ethiopia
- In office October 5, 1945 – October 8, 1947
- Preceded by: John K. Caldwell
- Succeeded by: George Robert Merrell

Personal details
- Born: 1887 St. Louis, Missouri, U.S.
- Died: July 23, 1969 (aged 81–82) Montclair, New Jersey, U.S.
- Spouse(s): Tatiana Zakushniak; Jeannette Watrous Berry
- Relatives: Nelson Dewey (grandfather)
- Education: Harvard University; George Washington University Law School

Felix Cole (1887 – July 23, 1969) was an American diplomat who served as the United States Ambassador to Ethiopia and Ceylon. Prior to his service as an ambassador he served as a consul in Russia, Romania, Australia, Poland, Latvia, French Algeria, and Liberia.

== Early life and education ==
Felix Cole was born in 1887, in St. Louis, Missouri, to Kate Dewey and John Cole. In 1910, he graduated from Harvard University and later graduated with a law degree from George Washington University Law School. After graduating from George Washington University Law School he started working for the Boston Herald. Cole's grandfather, Nelson Dewey, was the first governor of Wisconsin.

On October 10, 1915, he married Tatiana Zakushniak, a Russian dancer, while serving as the United States consul in Petrograd, Russia, and had one child with her before he filed for divorce in 1926.

== Career ==
In 1915, Cole received a job in the United States Department of State. He served as the United States consul in Arkhangelsk, Russian Empire. He was arrested by the Bolsheviks on July 7, 1918, and remained imprisoned until the Allies occupied Arkhangelsk in August.

In 1920, Cole was assigned as the United States consul in Bucharest, Romania. In 1924, he was assigned as the United States consul in Sydney, Australia. In 1928, he was assigned as the United States consul in Warsaw, Poland. During the 1930s he served as the Charge d'Affaires in Riga, Latvia. In 1944, he was appointed to serve as the first secretary of the United States legation to Liberia and as the consul general in Monrovia, Liberia.

During the 1940s he served as a consul in French Algeria and during his tenure he advised the United States against intervening against the actions of former Vichy officials on behalf of Algeria's 150,000 Jews.

=== Ambassador ===
On February 5, 1945, President Franklin D. Roosevelt appointed Cole to serve as the United States Ambassador to Ethiopia and was later approved by the United States Senate on February 20. On October 5, 1945, he presented his credentials and served until October 8, 1947. George Robert Merrell was appointed by President Harry S. Truman to replace Cole.

On March 29, 1948, President Truman appointed Cole to serve as the United States Ambassador to Ceylon and was later approved by the United States Senate on April 7. Cole was the first person to serve as the United States Ambassador to Ceylon. He presented his credentials on August 3, 1949, and served until October 30, 1949. Joseph C. Satterthwaite was appointed by Truman to replace Cole.

== Later life ==
On July 18, 1953, Cole married Jeannette Watrous Berry. He later served as chairman of the American Friends for Russian Freedom.

On July 23, 1969, Cole died either at home or at the Mountainside Medical Center in Montclair, New Jersey.

Diplomatic posts
Preceded by John K. Caldwell	U.S. Ambassador to Ethiopia; 1945–1947	Succeeded by George Robert Merrell
Preceded by Bernard Gufler	U.S. Ambassador to Ceylon; 1961–1964	Succeeded by Binky Barnes
