= List of ambassadors of the United States to Sri Lanka and the Maldives =

Ambassador of the United States to Sri Lanka
- Seal of the United States Department of State

- Flag of a United States ambassador

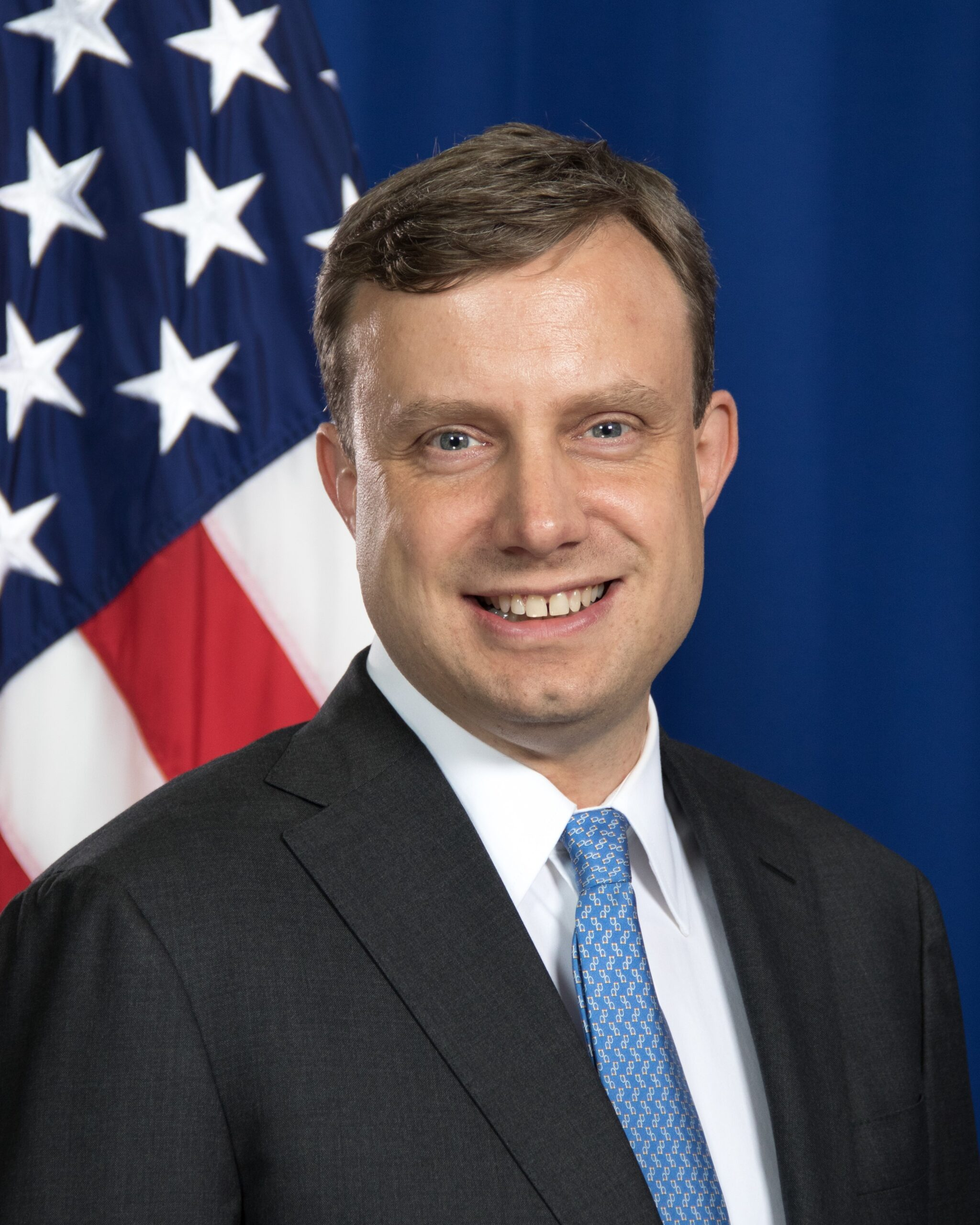
- Incumbent; Eric Meyer since August 25, 2026
- Nominator: The president of the United States
- Appointer: The president with Senate advice and consent
- Inaugural holder: Felix Cole as Envoy Extraordinary and Minister Plenipotentiary
- Formation: August 3, 1949
- Website: U.S. Embassy – Colombo

The position of United States ambassador to Sri Lanka and the Maldives has existed since 1949. (Note: until 1972 the name was: "United States Ambassador to Ceylon and the Maldives") Sri Lanka–United States relations and Maldives–United States relations have been friendly throughout the history of Sri Lanka and the history of the Maldives. The diplomatic mission representing the United States in both countries is located in Colombo, Sri Lanka. Jefferson House is the ambassadorial residence of the ambassador in Colombo.

== United States ambassadors ==
=== Ceylon ===
#	Name	Start date	Finish date		References
1	Felix Cole	August 3, 1949	October 30, 1949	Harry S. Truman	
2	Joseph C. Satterthwaite	November 19, 1949	July 25, 1953	Harry S. Truman Dwight D. Eisenhower	
3	Maxwell Henry Gluck	September 19, 1953	September 27, 1956	Dwight D. Eisenhower	
4	Philip K. Crowe	September 19, 1957	October 2, 1958	Dwight D. Eisenhower	
5	James Lampton Berry	November 22, 1958	June 3, 1959	Dwight D. Eisenhower	
6	Bernard Gufler	August 24, 1959	March 1, 1961	Dwight D. Eisenhower John F. Kennedy	
7	Frances E. Willis	May 11, 1961	September 20, 1964	John F. Kennedy Lyndon B. Johnson	
8	Cecil B. Lyon	October 30, 1964	June 17, 1967	Lyndon B. Johnson	
9	Andrew V. Corry	May 24, 1967	March 21, 1970	Lyndon B. Johnson Richard Nixon	

=== Sri Lanka ===
#	Name	Image	Career track	Start date	Finish date	President(s)	References
10	Robert Strausz-Hupé		Political appointee	May 3, 1970	December 12, 1971	Richard Nixon	
11	Christopher Van Hollen		Career FSO	October 27, 1972	April 21, 1976	Richard Nixon Gerald Ford	
12	John H. Reed		Political appointee	July 2, 1976	June 1, 1977	Gerald Ford Jimmy Carter	
13	William Howard Wriggins		Political appointee	August 18, 1977	December 13, 1979	Jimmy Carter	
14	Donald R. Toussaint		Career FSO	January 21, 1980	January 17, 1982	Jimmy Carter Ronald Reagan	
15	John H. Reed		Political appointee	February 8, 1982	September 3, 1985	Ronald Reagan	
16	James W. Spain		Career FSO	November 21, 1985	June 16, 1989	Ronald Reagan George H. W. Bush	
17	Marion V. Creekmore, Jr.		Career FSO	November 29, 1989	August 27, 1992	George H. W. Bush	
18	Teresita Currie Schaffer		Career FSO	October 7, 1992	August 15, 1995	George H. W. Bush Bill Clinton	
19	Peter Burleigh		Career FSO	January 19, 1996	August 1, 1997	Bill Clinton	
20	Shaun E. Donnelly			December 19, 1997	August 16, 2000	Bill Clinton	
21	E. Ashley Wills			November 13, 2000	June 17, 2003	Bill Clinton George W. Bush	
22	Jeffrey Lunstead			September 26, 2003	September 9, 2006	George W. Bush	
23	Robert O. Blake, Jr.		Career FSO	September 9, 2006	May 21, 2009	George W. Bush Barack Obama	
24	Patricia A. Butenis		Career FSO	September 17, 2009	August 1, 2012	Barack Obama	
25	Michele J. Sison		Career FSO	September 14, 2012	December 6, 2014	Barack Obama	
26	Atul Keshap		Career FSO	August 21, 2015	July 15, 2018	Barack Obama Donald Trump	
27	Alaina B. Teplitz		Career FSO	November 1, 2018	December 6, 2021	Donald Trump Joe Biden	
28	Julie J. Chung		Career FSO	February 25, 2022	January 16, 2026	Joe Biden Donald Trump	
–	Jayne Howell, chargé d'affaires a.i.		Career FSO	January 17, 2026	August 14, 2026	Donald Trump	
–	Joe Childers, chargé d'affaires a.i.		Career FSO	August 14, 2026	August 22, 2026	Donald Trump	
29	Eric Meyer		Career FSO	August 25, 2026		Donald Trump	

== See also ==
- Sri Lanka – United States relations
- Maldives – United States relations
- Foreign relations of Sri Lanka
- Foreign relations of the Maldives
- Ambassadors of the United States
