= Bernard Gufler =

American diplomat

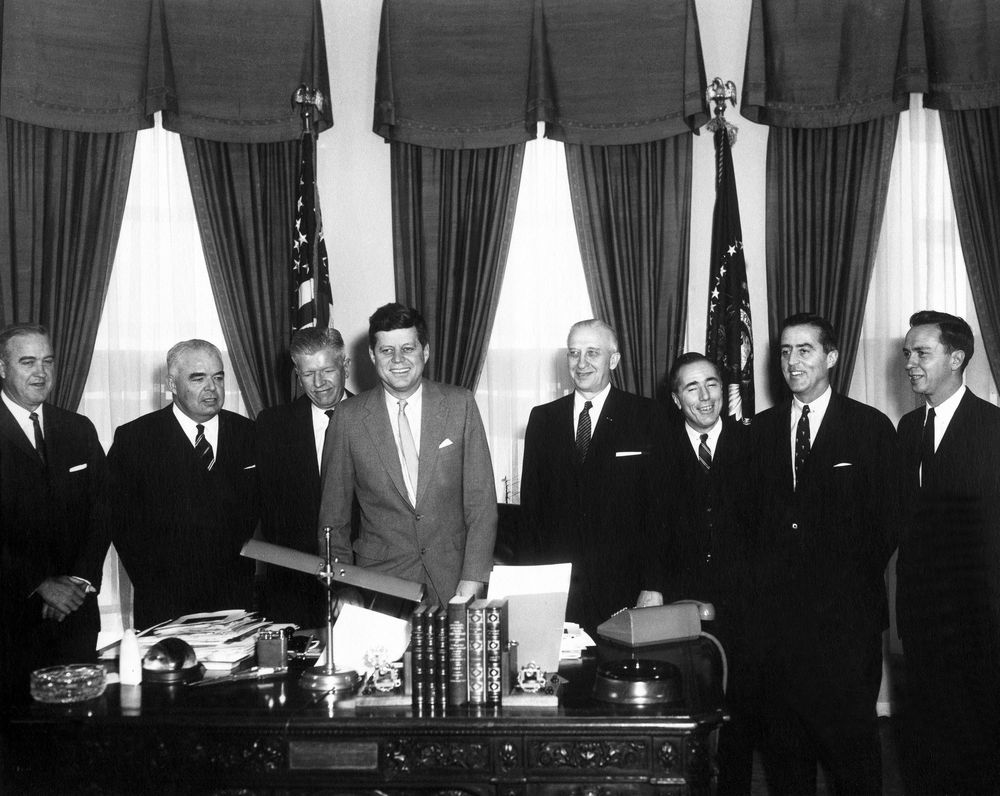
Gufler (second from left) with President Kennedy and other ambassadors in March 1961

Bernard Anthony Gufler (1 June 1903 – 6 September 1973) was a distinguished American diplomat and member of the United States Foreign Service. In a long career he served in many postings abroad, including Ambassador to Ceylon and Ambassador to Finland.

== Early life ==
He was born on 1 June 1903, in Lawrence city, Douglas County, Kansas, United States to a Catholic family. He obtained his early education from schools in Topeka and higher education from the University of Kansas, and later on from Princeton University. He was married to the former Dorothy 'Gretchen' Van Ness in December 1937.

== Career ==
He joined the United States Foreign Service in 1929 and served in postings in Canada, Latvia, Poland and Lithuania during the years before and during World War II and was US chief of mission in Berlin, East Germany, during 1955–58. He was US consul in Colombo, Ceylon, c. 1951 to 1953.

He was US ambassador to Ceylon (now Sri Lanka) from 1959 to 1961 and ambassador to Finland from 1961 to 1963. He retired from service in 1968 and died of a sudden heart attack, while visiting Bonn, Germany, on 6 September 1973.

Gufler's role as a diplomat acting in the U.S. interests, at many levels, cannot be underestimated. In the later years of World War II and early Cold War, he was instrumental in recommending that ex-Nazi POW generals and senior military officers be 'won over' to serve American (and Allied) intelligence interests in Europe, especially East Germany. President John F. Kennedy used Gufler to deliver to Finnish president Urho Kekkonen a secret message during the Note Crisis. During the peak of the Cold War in Berlin, he is remembered by other senior diplomats as the 'de facto ambassador', in fact running the United States mission effectively, in 'counterpoise' to Soviet actions and intentions. About his role in South Asia a Pakistani senior diplomat commented that his services were 'invaluable' in promoting the United States' positive image and winning people 'towards realizing the Cold War imperatives' as espoused by the Americans.

== See also ==
- Foreign policy of the United States
- Foreign relations of the United States
- Sri Lanka-United States relations
- United States Ambassador to Finland

Diplomatic posts
Preceded by Edson O. Sessions	United States Ambassador to Finland; 1961–1963	Succeeded by Carl T. Rowan
Preceded by Lampton Berry	United States Ambassador to Sri Lanka; 1959–1961	Succeeded by Frances E. Willis
