= Margaret Joy Tibbetts =

American diplomat

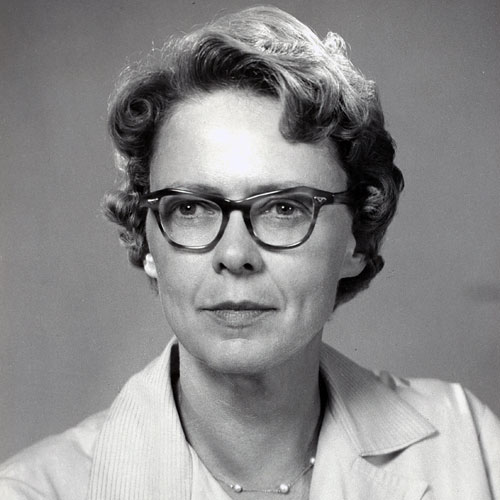

United States Ambassador to Norway
- In office July 31, 1964 – May 23, 1969
- President: Lyndon Johnson
- Preceded by: Clifton R. Wharton, Sr.
- Succeeded by: Philip K. Crowe

Personal details
- Born: August 26, 1919 Bethel, Maine, U.S.
- Died: April 25, 2010 (aged 90) Topsham, Maine, U.S.
- Education: Gould Academy; Wheaton College; Bryn Mawr College

Margaret Joy Tibbetts (August 26, 1919 – April 25, 2010) was an American diplomat. A career Foreign Service Officer, she was the United States Ambassador to Norway from 1964 to 1969 under President Lyndon Johnson. She attended Gould Academy, Wheaton College in Massachusetts and her Ph.D. from Bryn Mawr College. She was awarded an honorary degree from Bates College in 1962 and Bowdoin College in 1973.

== Early life and education ==
Tibbetts was born in Bethel, Maine on August 26, 1919. She was the third child of Dr. Raymond Tibbets, a physician, and Pearl Ashby Tibbets. In the 1930s, Pearl Tibbetts published a novel, Land Under Heaven, based on her family's history in Arooostook County, Maine. Tibbetts reportedly enjoyed spending time outdoors, and was a good student. She attended Gould Academy, a private boarding school in Bethel, where she was valedictorian of her class.

After graduating from high school in 1937, Tibbetts attended Wheaton College in Norton, Massachusetts, where she majored in history, and was involved in student government and basketball. To help pay for her tuition, she worked as a waitress and church usher. At Wheaton, she was a member of the honor society Phi Beta Kappa, and graduated summa cum laude in 1941.

Tibbets then enrolled in a PhD program at Bryn Mawr College, where she specialized in British political history. She graduated from Bryn Mawr in 1944, having earned both a master's degree and a doctorate.

== Career ==
=== Office of Strategic Services ===
Upon earning her doctorate in 1944, Tibbetts initially planned to become a history professor, but was recruited to work in the Office of Strategic Services (OSS), an American intelligence agency, by an OSS historian who had heard about Tibbetts from faculty members at Bryn Mawr. The death of her older brother in World War II may have contributed to her desire to join the war effort. Tibbet worked in the research and development section of the OSS, specializing in English history and politics. During her time at the OSS, Tibbetts conducted research for Walt Rostow and Ralph Bunche.

After the end of the war, Tibbetts again considered becoming a professor. She was offered a teaching position at Smith College, but instead accepted a position at the State Department in the Office of British Commonwealth Affairs. In this position, she was primarily involved in briefing and debriefing employees at the U.S. consulates in Canda.

=== Diplomacy in the United Kingdom ===
After the end of the war, Tibbetts again considered becoming a professor. She was offered a teaching position at Smith College, but instead accepted a position at the State Department in the Office of British Commonwealth Affairs. In this position, she was primarily involved in briefing and debriefing employees at the U.S. consulates in Canda. In 1948, she attended the United Nations General Assembly in Paris.

Tibbetts was sworn into the Foreign Service in 1949, and her first assignment was in the Political Affairs section of the Embassy of the United States, London. One of her major tasks over the next few years was to monitor British policy towards Africa, especially the debate over whether or not to create a Central African Federation. The Federation was formed in 1953, and it consisted of Southern Rhodesia (Zimbabwe), Northern Rhodesia (Zambia), and Nyasaland (Malawi). Tibbetts encouraged the U.S. government to support the British decision, and thus helped facilitate American involvement in the Federation. While serving at the embassy in London, Tibbetts attended a conference in Mozambique, visiting several parts of Africa on her journey. In 1955, the State Department posted her to the consulate in Leopoldville (Kinshasa), in what was then the Belgian Congo (Democratic Republic of Congo). She served for two years, focusing on economic issues. In one noteworthy message, she warned her colleagues in Washington about the potential for Congolese union leaders such as Patrice Lumumba to play a key role in future nationalist movements. In 1957, Tibbetts returned to the State Department and joined the European Bureau.

=== Ambassador to Norway ===
After two years working in the State Department's office of European affairs, in 1959 Tibbetts joined the staff of the International Cooperation Administration and served a two-year stint. Then, in 1961, she was posted at the U.S. embassy in Belgium and labored for three years. After that tenure she was enrolled in the prestigious State Department senior seminar, and it was while she was participating in that seminar that news of her possible appointment as an ambassador became known.

On 28 March 1964 during a press conference at his ranch in Texas, President Lyndon B. Johnson announced that "We have named, or planned to name, as Ambassador, Miss Margaret Tibbetts, who is a foreign service officer of the first class." He then added that "she has a Ph.D from Bryn Mawr. She was born in Maine." In her diary the next morning Tibbetts mentioned the president's announcement, and also the speculation that she might be posted to Finland. On 28 April Tibbetts, along with two other women diplomats, met with Johnson in the Oval Office. In her diary she described the meeting as "rather fabulous." On 20 July 1964 Johnson notified Tibbetts that she was being nominated as ambassador to Norway. Her hearing before the Senate Foreign Relations committee took place on 28 July and she was soon approved by the entire Senate. On 12 September 1964, Tibbetts again met briefly with Johnson in the Oval Office before her departure for Norway.

Tibbetts arrived in Oslo by ship and took over as ambassador. One of the highlights of her tenure took place in December 1964 when she hosted Martin Luther King and his entourage, as King was receiving the Nobel Peace Prize. While ambassador to Norway she participated in negotiations regarding military bases and atomic weapons. She also helped with the diplomatic arrangements for the visit to Washington by King Olav V of Norway. She returned to the United States in 1968, and then served briefly as Deputy Assistant Secretary of State for European Affairs.

== Later life and death ==
In 1971, Tibbets retired and returned to her home town of Bethel, Maine to take care of her mother. She taught courses at Bowdoin College, and was an active member of the Bethel Historical Society. She also worked to support Gould Academy and the Bethel Public Library. For nearly 40 years she was a well-known figure in Bethel, and could often be seen walking briskly on Paradise Hill. She died in April 2010 at the age of 90.

Diplomatic posts
Preceded by Clifton R. Wharton, Sr.	United States Ambassador to Norway; 1964–1969	Succeeded by Philip K. Crowe
