= Maldives–United States relations =

- Maldives: United States

Envoy
- Ambassador Abdul Ghafoor Mohamed: Chargé d'affaires Dave Williams

The United States has had friendly relations with the Republic of Maldives since the nation's independence from the United Kingdom in 1966.

The United States supports Maldivian independence and territorial integrity, and publicly endorsed India's timely intervention on behalf of the Maldivian Government during the November 1988 coup attempt. U.S. Naval vessels have regularly called at Malé in recent years. The Maldives extended strong support to U.S. efforts to combat terrorism and terrorist financing in 2001–2002.

The United States values the Maldives as a crucial ally in security matters and has actively engaged in counterterrorism efforts and trade initiatives with Malé, highlighted by a significant defense cooperation agreement in 2020. This increased collaboration comes as China increases its influence in the region.

The Maldives reopened its embassy in D.C. in 2023 which was previously closed in 2008 due to budget constraints. The US opened a new embassy in the Maldives the same year, with Ambassador Yon presenting his credentials to the President, becoming the US’ first resident ambassador in the country. The US Mission to the Maldives was previously based in the US Embassy in Colombo.

== History ==
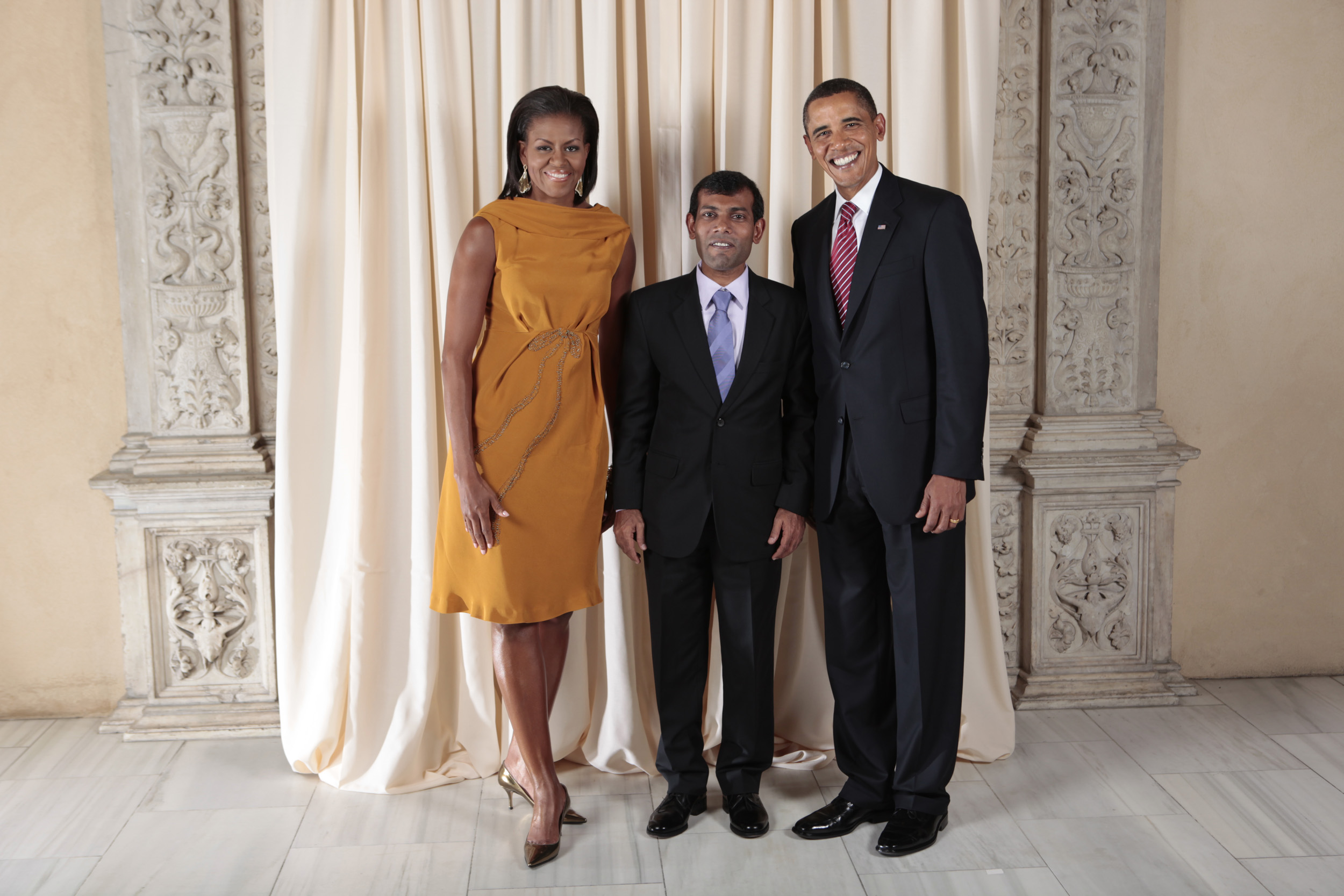
Former U.S. President Barack Obama, First Lady Michelle Obama and former President of Maldives Mohamed Nasheed in 2009

U.S. contributions to economic development in the Maldives have been made principally through international organization programs. Following the December 2004 tsunami, the U.S. and Maldives signed a bilateral assistance agreement for $8.6 million in reconstruction assistance. This assistance will help in the rebuilding of harbors, sewage systems, and electrical generation facilities and in the development of aid absorption capacity in the Ministry of Finance. The United States has directly funded training in airport management and narcotics interdiction and provided desktop computers for Maldivian customs, immigration, and drug-control efforts in recent years. The United States also trains a small number of Maldivian military personnel annually. About 10 U.S. citizens are resident in the Maldives; some 5,000 Americans visit the Maldives annually.

Hugo Yon is the current U.S. Ambassador to the Maldives. The relevant U.S. Embassy is in Colombo, Sri Lanka. Secretary of State Mike Pompeo announced during a trip to the Maldives that the United States would be opening an embassy in Malé. The opening of an embassy will combat growing Chinese influence in a country that stretches through crucial shipping lanes.

== Defense ==
The United States and the Maldives have been deepening their military and political ties since the election of Ibrahim Mohamed Solih as President of the Maldives. In September 2020 the United States and Maldives signed a defense agreement with each other in Philadelphia. The agreement had been in the works since 2013, but had previously been blocked by the Indian government's opposition to the agreement. Indian officials have since welcomed the agreement saying that Maldives is part of the Indo-Pacific. The United States is one of several countries that provides military aid to broaden the capacity of the Maldivian Armed Forces.

== Aid ==
The United States donated 60 ventilators to the Maldives during the COVID-19 pandemic. The United States also provided a grant of $2 million for economic support during the pandemic and $150,000 worth of personal protective equipment.

In 2021, the United States donated 128,700 Pfizer-BioNTech Covid-19 vaccines to the Maldives. The vaccines were delivered through COVAX and helped boost immunization rates in the country.

USAID pledged to provide an additional $7.2 million to the Maldives to in 2023. Administrator Samantha Power also announced a new USAID country office in the Maldives the same year.
