= Joseph C. Satterthwaite =

American diplomat (1900–1990)

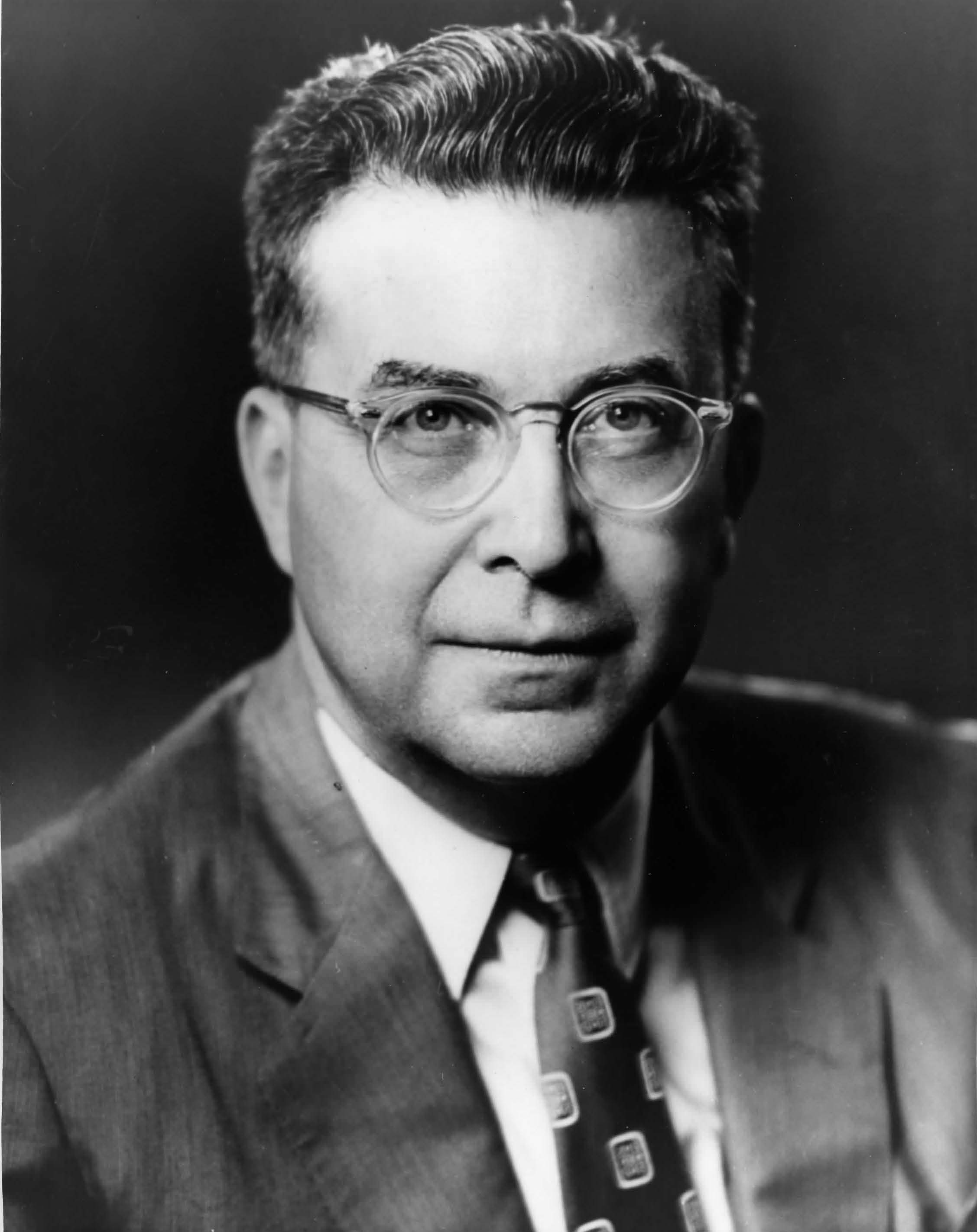

11th United States Ambassador to South Africa
- In office May 22, 1961 – November 17, 1965
- President: John F. Kennedy; Lyndon B. Johnson
- Preceded by: Philip K. Crowe
- Succeeded by: William M. Rountree

1st Assistant Secretary of State for African Affairs
- In office September 2, 1958 – January 31, 1961
- President: Dwight D. Eisenhower; John F. Kennedy
- Preceded by: Position established
- Succeeded by: G. Mennen Williams

United States Consul General to Morocco
- In office September 8, 1953 – May 1, 1955
- President: Dwight D. Eisenhower
- Preceded by: John Carter Vincent
- Succeeded by: Julius C. Holmes

2nd United States Ambassador to Ceylon
- In office November 19, 1949 – July 25, 1953
- President: Harry S. Truman; Dwight D. Eisenhower
- Preceded by: Felix Cole
- Succeeded by: Maxwell Henry Gluck

6th Director General of the Foreign Service
- In office May 6, 1957 – September 1, 1958
- Preceded by: Raymond A. Hare
- Succeeded by: Waldemar J. Gallman

Personal details
- Born: Joseph Charles Satterthwaite; March 14, 1900 Tecumseh, Michigan, U.S.
- Died: November 19, 1990 (aged 90) Washington, D.C., U.S.
- Education: University of Michigan (B.A., M.A.)
- Occupation: Diplomat

Joseph Charles Satterthwaite (March 14, 1900 – November 19, 1990) was an American career diplomat.

== Biography ==
=== Early life and positions ===
Sattherwaite was born in Tecumseh, Michigan on March 14, 1900. His family had first moved to that state in 1831. He attended the University of Michigan, earning a B.A. degree in 1923 and a M.A. degree in 1924. His first job with the US Foreign Service was as a clerk in the Stuttgart consulate in 1926. From there, appointments followed in Guadalajara, Mexico City, Buenos Aires, Baghdad, Ankara and Damascus. As part of a State Department special diplomatic mission, Satterthwaite presented a letter from President Harry S. Truman to King Tribhuvan, recognizing Nepal's independence, on April 21, 1947. This task proved difficult, as foreigners could only enter with consent of the Prime Minister, and the group had to travel by rail, road, pack train and sedan chair.

=== Increasing seniority ===
Satterthwaite served as United States Ambassador to Sri Lanka from 1949 to 1952, Head of the U.S. Legation at Tangier from 1953 to 1955, and as United States Ambassador to Burma from April 1955 to April 1957. For a brief period between May 6, 1957, and September 1, 1958, he was Director General of the Foreign Service. He then served as the first Assistant Secretary of State for African Affairs between 1958 and 1961. One of his duties in that role was hosting an African Regional Conference from June 9–11, 1959 in Lourenco Marques (now Maputo).

=== South Africa and later career ===
Sattherwaite was reappointed as an ambassador, this time to South Africa, from 1961 to 1965. Following the Sharpeville massacre, President John F. Kennedy's administration was taking a renewed look at the country. Satterthwaite later recalled that Kennedy had told him "You can tell the prime minister of South Africa that I'm not sending you out there to point your finger at them, (the South Africans) but that they must realize the problems we have with their racial policy". While in South Africa, Satterthwaite learned of Kennedy's assassination from the Belgian ambassador (who had been listenening to the BBC World Service). This forced him to break off a dinner party he was holding and announce the news, bringing some of the South African guests to tears. His embassy held a Catholic memorial service shortly after.

He spoke highly of his time under the Truman, Eisenhower and Kennedy administrations, saying in an interview that he "never had any pressure from the White House that was objectionable in the least. Obviously pressures were brought by Congress sometimes, but that's something else, that's just par for the course, you can expect that; but certainly not from the White House under either Truman or Eisenhower. I think this is true of Kennedy, too".

After South Africa he retired from the Foreign Service, becoming a consultant on foreign affairs.

He died in Washington, D.C., on November 19, 1990, at the age of 90, due to pneumonia.

Diplomatic posts
Preceded by Felix Cole	U.S. Ambassador to Sri Lanka; September 22, 1949 – July 25, 1953	Succeeded by Philip K. Crowe
Preceded by John Carter Vincent	Head of the U.S. Legation at Tangier; June 24, 1953 – May 1, 1955	Succeeded by Julius C. Holmes
Preceded by William J. Sebald	U.S. Ambassador to Burma; April 4, 1955 – April 1, 1957	Succeeded by Walter P. McConaughy
Preceded by Philip K. Crowe	United States Ambassador to South Africa; April 6, 1961 – November 17, 1965	Succeeded by William M. Rountree
Government offices
Preceded by Raymond A. Hare	Director General of the Foreign Service; May 6, 1957 – September 1, 1958	Succeeded by Waldemar J. Gallman
Preceded by New office	Assistant Secretary of State for African Affairs; September 2, 1958 – January 31, 1961	Succeeded by G. Mennen Williams
