= Norrœna Society =

Northern European cultural organization

The Norrœna Society was an early 20th-century publishing house dedicated to Northern European culture. It published expensively produced reprints of classic 19th-century editions, mostly translations, of Old Norse literary and historical works, Northern European folklore, and medieval literature.

== Historical background ==
The Norrœna Society was established by Rasmus B. Anderson, who served as United States Ambassador to Denmark (1885–89) and the founding head of the Department of Scandinavian Studies at the University of Wisconsin–Madison, the oldest such department in an American university. He spearheaded the "large literary venture" as part of his lifelong aim to educate an unfamiliar American audience about the culture, history and pre-Christian religion of Northern Europe, publishing a wide range of works on these subjects. One contemporary reviewer described the mission of his publishing project as “resurrecting, reproducing, collecting and collating or indexing every thing that pertained to the early history of the Anglo Saxon, Celtic, Teutonic, and Scandinavian races—to furnish the people of Northern Europe with their own vital history.”

It has been spuriously claimed that the Norrœna Society was an international organization of members founded by Oscar II in addition to being a publishing house. However, scholars reject this claim and assert that the Norrœna Society only existed as a publishing house. Professor Einar Haugen reported that "Professor Anderson himself has told me that he was approached by a publisher in St. Louis, who made a practice of putting out reprints of famous books in expensive editions ... In order to add impressiveness to the [Norrœna Library] set a fictitious society was created." To further this pretence, the imprint of the Norrœna Society's publications gives false offices in countries such as Stockholm, Copenhagen, and Berlin, and the majority of their editions contain a frontispiece stating that the volumes were “privately printed for members”. It has been reported that a "certificate of membership" was bound into the first volume of at least one set, though buyers of the Norrœna Library set are more accurately referred to as customers or subscribers rather than as members.

In Old Norse, norrœnn means "Norse" or "northern"; the feminine norrœnna, as a substantive, refers to either the Old Norse language, or to a northern breeze. Anderson himself used the term to apply to medieval Northern European literature, which he also referred to as Anglo-Saxon classics, according to faceplates in all volumes of the Norrœna Library. In academic references to these publications, the word Norrœna is commonly transliterated as Norroena and less often as Norraena.

== Norrœna Library ==
Rasmus Anderson acted as editor-in-chief of the Norrœna Library, a multi-volume subscription set, which he considered “the crowning part of my efforts in the service of Scandinavian literature.” Eight of the volumes were his own translations. The remainder were by other translators with their consent. Various bibliographic references to these sets list either fifteen or sixteen volumes (the sixteenth being The Flatey Book and recently discovered Vatican Manuscripts concerning America as early as the tenth century, etc.). The most common number of volumes listed is fifteen. James William Buel (1849–1920), a prolific American author, compiler, and editor of numerous books in a wide range of subjects, acted as managing editor. T.H. Smart held the copyright.

A common criticism of these editions is the fact that, as reprints of earlier works, they were lacking in new content. However, the set helped to popularize these texts, allowing them to reach new audiences for the first time. In addition, many collectors held them in high regard due to their attractive presswork and binding designs. In a letter to Anderson, U.S. President Theodore Roosevelt stated that he kept his set in the most valued part of his library, though the president later threatened to return the set after Anderson broke his trust by publishing his private opinion of them in order to boost sales.

At the time of their publication, the Norrœna Library was the largest collection of medieval Nordic literature published outside of Scandinavia. Bound in ten different historical bindings, each set originally sold for US$50–2,500 per set, priced according to print, paper quality, illustrations, and binding. Each edition had a limited print run. These sets were usually hand-numbered and all contained illustrations in colour. The Stanford University Library and the Library of Congress hold unnumbered sets. In some sets, individual works do not contain markings indicating volume number. Assigned volume numbers sometimes vary in catalogued library holdings.

== Editions ==
Known editions of the set include:

The Imperial Edition (1905), with a print run of 350 sets. Leather bound with gilt-tooled designs on front and back covers. All volumes have gilt top edge and marbled endpapers. There are ten cover designs. Volumes (1,2), (3,4,5) and (7.8.9) share the same cover designs. With the exception of Volume 15, the cover designs are based on historically significant gilt cover designs. The cover designs of volume six is based on the cover of Historia Belli Dacici designed by "Le Gascon" (Gillede)

The Royal Edition (1907), bound in red leather, with a print run of 450 complete sets.
The Editor’s Autograph Edition (1907), with a print run of 500 sets.
The Memorial Edition (1907), with a print run of 350 complete sets.
The Imperial Autograph Edition, with a print run of 350 sets.
The American Limited Edition, bound in dark blue leather, embossed with elaborate gilt designs, with a print run of 10 complete sets.

Each of these contain an elaborately illustrated color frontispiece stating, "Anglo-Saxon Classics. Norrœna Embracing the History and Romance of Northern Europe” with the words “privately printed for members” at the base of the illustration. The remainder of the sets contain a simple frontispiece consisting of a decorated border framing the descriptive phrase, "The History and Romance of Northern Europe; a Library of Supreme Classics Printed in Complete Form.” These editions include:

The Viking Edition (1906) of which there are at least two known versions, each consisting of a print run of 650 copies. One version is bound in dark green cloth with an illustrated lithograph, containing the title of the work, pasted to the spine. The other is bound in dark blue cloth with black leather trim joined with gold thread, embossed with gilt-tooled designs.
The Vinland Edition (1906), with a print run of "100 numbered and registered complete sets."

=== The Saxo Edition ===
In his 1908 biography of Icelandic Sagas, Halldor Hermannsson references a "Viking Edition" set and mentions a "Saxo Edition". The Saxo Edition is mentioned by no other source and no example of the set has been either presented for sale or listed in a library collection.

=== Eight Volume Edition ===
Author Andrew Wawn claimed that an eight-volume set existed but offered no sources in support of the claim. In the same book, he claimed that Benjamin Thorpe's 1866 Edda and Thomas Percy's Northern Antiquities were included in the eight-volume set.

== Complete works ==
Volume numbers are based on the Imperial Edition (1905). According to bibliographic references, volume numbering may have varied by edition. Since volumes do not contain internal markings indication their order, these variations may be due to individual library cataloging procedures.

- Books 1-2. The Nine Books of the Danish History of Saxo Grammaticus in Two Volumes. Translated by Oliver Elton, B.A. with some considerations on Saxo's sources, historical methods and folk-lore by Frederick York Powell, M.A., F.S.A. (abridged reprint of the original 1899 version, single volume)
- Books 3-5. Teutonic Mythology, Gods and Goddesses of the Northland, in Three Volumes by Viktor Rydberg Ph.D. Authorised translation from the Swedish by Rasmus B. Anderson, LL. D. (reprint of Teutonic Mythology, 1889, single volume. The subtitle has been added after the author's death).
- Book 6. The Volsunga Saga. Translated from the Icelandic by Eirikr Magnusson and William M. Morris with introduction H. Halliday Sparling, supplemented with legends of the Wagner Trilogy by Jessie L. Weston. (Supplemented reprint from the 1888 edition).
- Books 7-9. The Heimskringla. A History of the Norse Kings by Snorre Sturlason done into English out of the Icelandic by Samuel Laing, Esq. with Revised notes by Hon. Rasmus B. Anderson. (This version of Heimskringla excludes Samuel Laing's translation of Ynglingasaga.)
- Book 10. The Story of Burnt Njal. The Great Icelandic Tribune, Jurist, and Counsellor. Translated from Njal's Saga by the late Sir George Webbe Dasent, D.C.L. With Editor's Prefatory Note and Author's Introduction.

Books 11-15 are known collectively (and erroneously) as "The Anglo-Saxon Chronicles":

- Book 11. The Elder Eddas of Saemund Sigfusson. Translated from the Original Old Norse Text into English by Benjamin Thorpe and The Younger Edda of Snorre Sturleson Translated from the Original Old Norse Text into English by I.A. Blackwell. (Benjamin Thorpe's 1865-1866 translation, originally titled The Edda of Sæmund the Learned, has been amended to exclude the poem Hrafnagaldur Óðins or Forspallsljóð).
- Book 12. Romances and Epics of our Northern Ancestors: Norse, Celt and Teuton. Translated from the Works of Dr. W. Wagner with introduction by W. S. W. Anson. (A reprint of Epics and Romances of the Middle Ages: adapted from the work of Dr. W. Wägner by M. W. MacDowall, ed. W.S.W. Anson, 1883).
- Book 13. A Collection of Popular Tales from the Norse and North German by George Webbe Dasent D.C.L., with an introductory essay on the origin and diffusion of popular tales [by Peter Christen Asbjørnsen]
- Book 14. The Arthurian Tales. The Greatest of Romances Which Recount the Noble and Valorous Deeds of King Arthur and the Knights of the Round Table. Compiled by Sir Thomas Malory, Knight, and Edited from the Text of the Edition of 1634, with an introduction by Ernest Rhys.
- Book 15. The Norse Discovery of America. A Compilation in Extenso of all the Sagas, Manuscripts, and Inscriptive Memorials Relating to the Finding and Settlement of the New World in the Eleventh Century. With Presentations of Freshly Discovered Proofs, in the form of Church Records Supplied by the Vatican of Rome, Never Before Published. Translations and deductions by Arthur Middleton Reeves, North Ludlow Beamish, and Hon. Rasmus B. Anderson.

In addition, a sixteenth volume was published by the Norrœna Society in 1906 without either frontispiece which characterizes the Norrœna Library editions, accounting for bibliographic references to a sixteen volume set:

- The Flatey Book and recently discovered Vatican Manuscripts concerning America as early as the tenth century, etc. Ed. Rasmus B. Anderson. With reproductions of the Hauk Book (1906). Bound in brown and green leather, embossed with a belt and ship design under the title "PreColumbian Historical Treasures 1000-1492".
