= Thomas Ryan Byrne =

American historian, economist, and diplomat

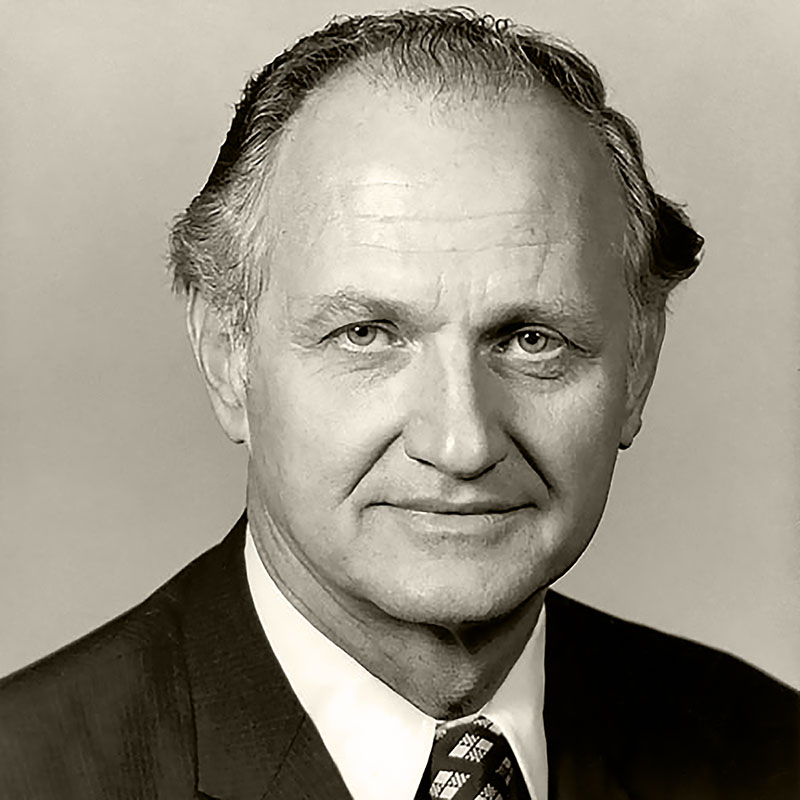

United States Ambassador to Norway
- In office October 4, 1973 – April 10, 1976
- President: Richard Nixon
- Preceded by: Philip K. Crowe
- Succeeded by: William Anders

United States Ambassador to Czechoslovakia
- In office June 23, 1976 – November 15, 1978
- President: Gerald Ford
- Preceded by: Albert W. Sherer Jr.
- Succeeded by: Francis Joseph Meehan

Personal details
- Born: February 4, 1923 Teaneck , New Jersey, U.S.
- Died: March 30, 2014 (aged 91) Bethesda, Maryland, U.S.
- Relatives: Phil Klay (grandson)
- Education: Georgetown University

Thomas Ryan Byrne (February 4, 1923 – March 30, 2014) was an American historian, economist, career diplomat and United States Ambassador. He received a doctorate in history and a master's degree in economics at Georgetown University.

He later worked in the US Foreign Service as a diplomat.

== Ambassador ==
From 1973 to 1976 Byrne was the United States Ambassador to the Kingdom of Norway. He presented his credentials as an Ambassador to King Olav V of Norway on October 4, 1973, and served in office in Oslo until April 10, 1976.

After the stationing in Norway, he moved to Prague where he was the United States Ambassador to the Czechoslovak Socialist Republic from June 1976 until November 1978.

Diplomatic posts
Preceded by Philip K. Crowe	United States Ambassador to Norway; 1973–1976	Succeeded by William Anders
Preceded by Albert W. Sherer, Jr.	United States Ambassador to Czechoslovakia; 1976–1978	Succeeded by Francis J. Meehan
