= Public holidays in the Maldives =

This is a list of holidays in Maldives.

== Dates set by the Maldivian Government ==
Date	English name	Local name	Transliteration	Remarks
1 January	New Year's Day	މީލާދީ އައުއަހަރު ފެށޭ ދުވަސް	Milaadhee Aa' Aharu Feshey Dhuvas	First day of the Gregorian new year.
1 May	Labour Day	ބައިނަލްއަޤައުމީ މަސައްކަތްތެރިންގެ ދުވަސް	Bhainala'Qaumee Masaikkaiytheringe Dhuvas	May Day.
26-27 July	Independence Day	މިނިވަން ދުވަސް	Minivan Dhuvas	Annual celebration to commemorate the day of declaration of Independence.
3 November	Victory Day	ނަޞްރުގެ ދުވަސް	Nasruge Dhuvas	To commemorate the failure of a coup attempt in 1988.
11 November	Republic Day	ޖުމްހޫރީ ދުވަސް	Jumhooree Dhuvas	To commemorate the beginning of the Maldivian Second Republic.

== Dates set by the Islamic calendar ==
Date	English name	Local name	Transliteration	Remarks
1 Muharram	Islamic New Year	ހިޖުރީ އައުއަހަރު ފެށޭ ދުވަސް	Hijuree Aa' Aharu Feshey Dhuvas	First day of the Hijri new year.
1 Rabi' al-Awwal	National Day	ޤައުމީ ދުވަސް	Qaumee Dhuvas	To commemorate the victory of Muhammad Thakurufaanu over the Portuguese occupation in the year 1573.
12 Rabi' al-Awwal	Mawlid	ކީރިތި ރަސޫލާގެ ޢީދު މީލާދު	Kheerithi Rasoola Ge Eid Milaadhu	Birthday of the Islamic prophet Muhammad.
2 Rabi' al-Thani	The Day Maldives Embraced Islam	ރާއްޖެ އިސްލާމްވި ދުވަސް	Raajje Islamvi Dhuvas	Abu Barakat Yusuf the Berber peacefully introduced Islam.
1 Ramadan	Ramadan	ރަމަޟާންމަހުގެ ފުރަތަމަ ދުވަސް / ރޯދަމަހުގެ ފުރަތަމަ ދުވަސް	Ramzan Mahuge Furuthama Dhuvas / Roadha Mahuge Furuthama Dhuvas	Marking the beginning of Ramadan.
1-3 Shawwal	Eid al-Fitr	ފިޠުރު ޢީދު ދުވަސް / ކުޑަ ޢީދު ދުވަސް	Fitr Eidu'Dhuvas / Khuda Eidu'Dhuvas	Marking the end of Ramadan.
9 Dhu al-Hijjah	Day of Arafat	އަރަފާތް ދުވަސް / ޙައްޖު ދުވަސް	Arafaathu Dhuvas / Hajju Dhuvas	Muslims who're not in Hajj recommend to fast on the Day of Arafat.
10-13 Dhu al-Hijjah	Eid al-Adha	އަޟްޙާ ޢީދު ދުވަސް / ބޮޑު ޢީދު ދުވަސް	Adhaa Eidu'Dhuvas / Bodu Eidu'Dhuvas	To commemorate Abraham's sacrifice on Ishmael.
