= List of ambassadors of the United States to Denmark =

Ambassador of the United States of America to the Kingdom of Denmark

- United States ambassador flag

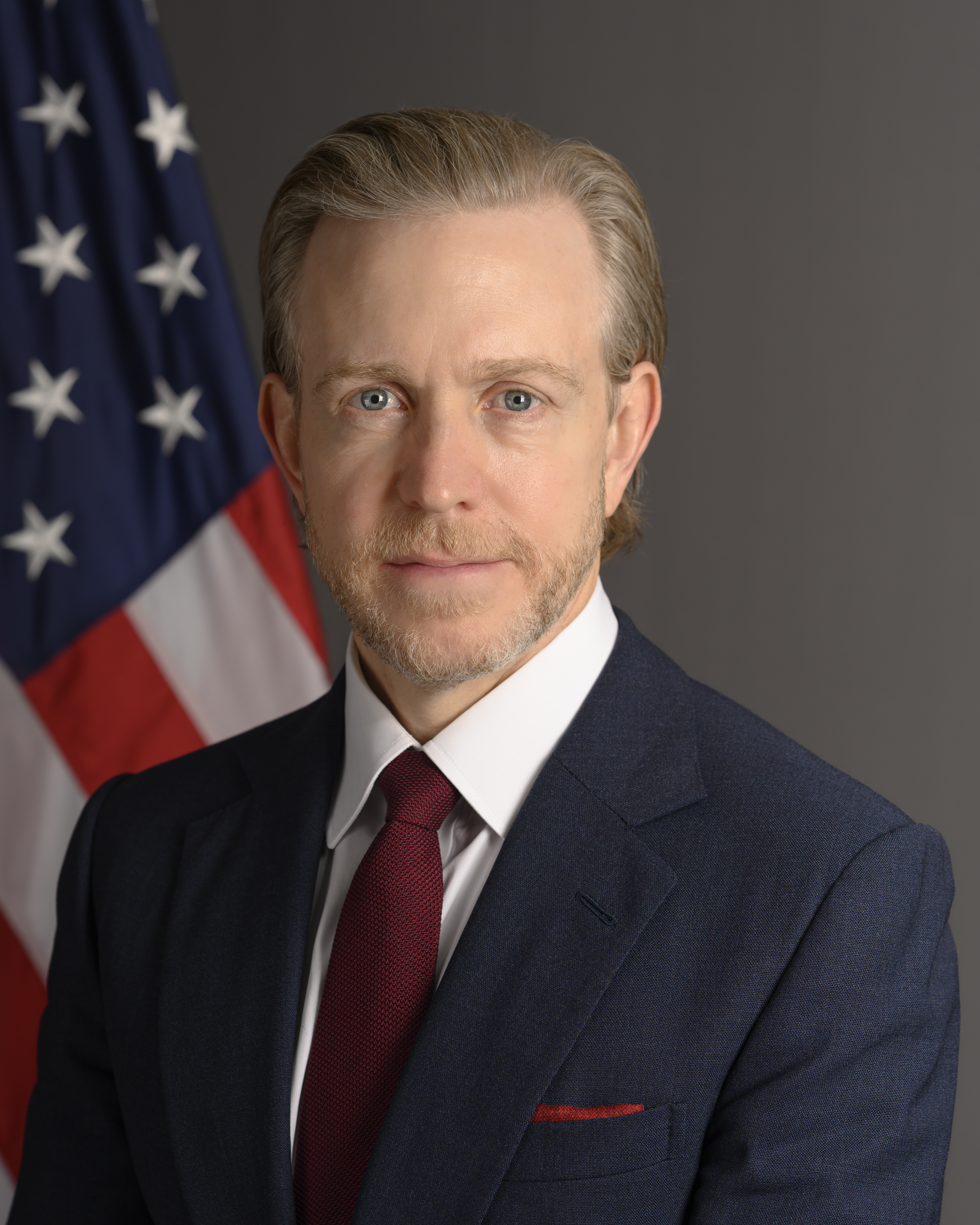
- Incumbent; Ken Howery since November 5, 2025
- U.S. Department of State; Embassy of the United States, Copenhagen
- Style: The Honorable (formal); Mr. Ambassador (informal)
- Reports to: U.S. Secretary of State
- Residence: Rydhave
- Seat: Copenhagen, Denmark
- Nominator: The president
- Appointer: The president; with the advice and consent of the Senate
- Term length: At the pleasure of the president; No fixed term
- Inaugural holder: Henry Wheaton as Chargé d’Affaires
- Formation: March 3, 1827
- Website: dk.usembassy.gov

The first representative from the United States to Denmark was appointed in 1827 as a chargé d'affaires. There followed a series of chargés and resident ministers until 1890 when the first full diplomatic envoy (envoy extraordinary and minister plenipotentiary) was appointed. The title was changed to Ambassador Extraordinary and Plenipotentiary in 1947. The ambassador's offices are housed within the Embassy of the United States, Copenhagen.

== List of ambassadors ==
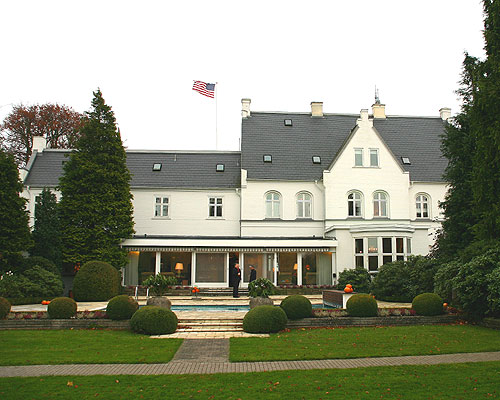
Rydhave, the residence of the U.S. ambassador in Copenhagen

=== Chargé d'Affaires (1827–1854) ===
Name	Portrait	Appointed	Presented credentials	Terminated mission
Henry Wheaton		March 3, 1827	September 20, 1827	Presented recall on or shortly before May 29, 1835
Jonathan F. Woodside		March 3, 1835	September 1, 1835	Paid farewell calls on June 29, 1841
Isaac Rand Jackson		May 20, 1841	October 12, 1841	July 27, 1842 †
William W. Irwin		March 3, 1843	June 19, 1847	Presented recall on June 12, 1847
Robert P. Flenniken		January 11, 1847	June 12, 1847	Presented recall on September 15, 1849
Walter Forward		October 8, 1850	June 15, 1850	Recalled on September 10, 1851
Andrew J. Ogle		January 22, 1852		
Miller Grieve		August 30, 1852	December 15, 1852	Left post on or after June 23, 1853
Henry Bedinger		May 24, 1853	October 13, 1853	Promoted to Minister Resident on September 23, 1854

=== Minister Resident (1854–1876) ===
Name	Portrait	Appointed	Presented credentials	Terminated mission
Henry Bedinger		May 29, 1854	September 23, 1854	Presented recall on August 10, 1858
James M. Buchanan		May 11, 1858	August 10, 1858	Presented recall on May 10, 1861
Bradford R. Wood		March 22, 1861	August 18, 1861	Presented recall on November 15, 1865
Samuel J. Kirkwood		March 11, 1863		
George H. Yeaman		August 25, 1865	November 20, 1865	Presented recall on November 7, 1870
Christopher Columbus Andrews		April 16, 1869		
Michael J. Cramer		September 9, 1870	November 7, 1870	Presented recall on October 2, 1876

=== Chargé d'Affaires (1876–1882) ===
Name	Portrait	Appointed	Presented credentials	Terminated mission
Michael J. Cramer		August 15, 1876	October 2, 1876	Presented recall on August 12, 1881
Adam Badeau		N/A		
Charles Payson		July 30, 1881	August 12, 1881	Left post on January 23, 1882
J. P. Wickersham		May 1, 1882	June 13, 1882	Promoted to Minister Resident/Consul General August 21, 1882

=== Minister Resident/Consul General (1882–1890) ===
Name	Portrait	Appointed	Presented credentials	Terminated mission
J. P. Wickersham		July 13, 1882	August 21, 1882	Notified the Government of Denmark from in Paris September 8, 1882
Wickham Hoffman		February 27, 1883	May 4, 1883	Presented recall on June 1, 1885
Rasmus B. Anderson		April 2, 1885	May 1, 1885	Presented recall on August 28, 1889
John A. Enander		March 13, 1889		
Clark E. Carr		May 16, 1889	August 28, 1889	Promoted to Envoy Extraordinary and Minister Plenipotentiary on July 30, 1890

=== Envoy Extraordinary and Minister Plenipotentiary (1890–1947) ===
Name	Portrait	Appointed	Presented credentials	Terminated mission
Clark E. Carr		July 30, 1890	September 22, 1890	Presented recall on July 14, 1893
John E. Risley		March 27, 1893	July 14, 1890	Presented recall on December 11, 1897
Laurits S. Swenson		October 4, 1897	December 11, 1897	Presented recall on May 27, 1905
Thomas J. O'Brien		March 6, 1905	May 27, 1905	Left post on June 5, 1907
Maurice Francis Egan; Political appointee		June 10, 1907	September 6, 1907	Left post on December 16, 1917
Norman Hapgood; Political appointee		April 16, 1919	June 17, 1919	Left post on December 9, 1919
Joseph C. Grew; Career FSO		April 7, 1920	June 9, 1920	Left post on October 14, 1921
John Dyneley Prince; Political appointee		August 24, 1921	November 23, 1921	Presented recall on March 30, 1926
Henry Percival Dodge; Career FSO		February 23, 1926	August 24, 1926	Left post on March 1, 1930
Ralph H. Booth; Political appointee		January 22, 1930	June 13, 1930	Relinquished charge on May 11, 1931
Frederick W. B. Coleman; Political appointee		September 23, 1931	February 10, 1932	Appointment terminated on May 1, 1933
Ruth Bryan Owen; Political appointee		April 13, 1933	May 29, 1933	Left post on June 27, 1936
Alvin Mansfield Owsley; Political appointee		May 28, 1937	June 16, 1937	Left post on May 15, 1939
Ray Atherton; Career FSO		August 7, 1939	September 8, 1939	Left post on June 5, 1940
Monnett B. Davis; Career FSO		June 8, 1945	June 21, 1945	Left post on January 10, 1946
Josiah Marvel Jr. Political appointee		March 13, 1946	April 23, 1946	Promoted to Ambassador Extraordinary and Plenipotentiary on February 27, 1947

=== Ambassador Extraordinary and Plenipotentiary (1947–) ===
Name	Portrait	Appointed	Presented credentials	Terminated mission
Josiah Marvel Jr. Political appointee		February 27, 1947	March 18, 1947	Left post on March 4, 1949
Eugenie Anderson; Political appointee		October 20, 1949	December 22, 1949	Left post on January 19, 1953
Robert D. Coe; Career FSO		July 29, 1953	September 25, 1953	Relinquished charge on June 1, 1957
Val Peterson; Political appointee		June 26, 1957	August 22, 1957	Left post on February 21, 1961
William McCormick Blair, Jr. Political appointee		March 29, 1961	May 9, 1961	Left post on May 17, 1964
Katharine Elkus White; Political appointee		April 8, 1964	June 2, 1964	Left post on September 9, 1968
Angier Biddle Duke; Political appointee		September 26, 1968	October 3, 1968	Left post on May 1, 1969
Guilford Dudley Jr. Political appointee		May 13, 1969	June 18, 1969	Left post on November 2, 1971
Fred J. Russell; Political appointee		November 5, 1971	December 9, 1971	Left post on November 4, 1972
Philip K. Crowe; Political appointee		July 16, 1973	September 13, 1973	Left post on September 27, 1975
John Gunther Dean; Career FSO		October 23, 1975	November 6, 1975	Left post on July 18, 1978
Warren Demian Manshel; Political appointee		June 22, 1978	July 31, 1978	Left post on March 6, 1981
John Langeloth Loeb, Jr. Political appointee		July 30, 1981	October 13, 1981	Left post on September 13, 1983
Terence A. Todman; Career FSO		October 3, 1983	November 17, 1983	Left post on January 8, 1989
Keith Lapham Brown; Political appointee		November 2, 1988	January 8, 1989	Left post on January 16, 1992
Richard B. Stone; Political appointee		November 21, 1991	February 10, 1992	Left post on October 14, 1993
Edward Elliot Elson; Political appointee		November 22, 1993	January 18, 1994	Left post on June 25, 1998
Richard Swett; Political appointee		June 29, 1998	September 8, 1998	Left post on July 6, 2001
Stuart A. Bernstein; Political appointee		August 3, 2001	September 3, 2001	Left post on January 16, 2005
James Cain; Political appointee		August 2, 2005	September 9, 2005	Left post on January 23, 2009
Laurie S. Fulton; Political appointee		July 15, 2009	August 3, 2009	Left post on February 15, 2013
Rufus Gifford; Political appointee		July 15, 2013	August 13, 2013	Left post on January 20, 2017
Carla Sands; Political appointee		November 2, 2017	December 15, 2017	Left post on January 20, 2021
Alan Leventhal; Political appointee		June 15, 2022	July 1, 2022	Left post on January 20, 2025
Jennifer Hall Godfrey; Career FSO - Chargé d'affaires		January 20, 2025		Left post on June 28, 2025
Mark Stroh; Career FSO - Chargé d'affaires		June 28, 2025		Left post of October 30, 2025
Ken Howery; Political appointee		October 7, 2025	November 5, 2025	Incumbent

== See also ==
- Denmark–United States relations
- Foreign relations of Denmark
- Ambassadors of the United States
