= Waldemar J. Gallman =

American diplomat

7th Director General of the Foreign Service
- In office November 17, 1958 – January 31, 1961
- Preceded by: Joseph Charles Satterthwaite
- Succeeded by: Tyler Thompson

Personal details
- Born: April 27, 1899 Wellsville, New York, U.S.
- Died: June 28, 1980 (aged 81) Washington, D.C., U.S.
- Education: Cornell University

Waldemar John Gallman (April 27, 1899 – June 28, 1980) was an American diplomat who served as the American ambassador to the Polish People's Republic, Union of South Africa, Kingdom of Iraq, and Arab Federation.

== Early life and education ==
Waldemar John Gallman was born in Wellsville, New York, on April 27, 1889. He graduated from Cornell University in 1921, and did graduate work at Cornell and Georgetown University.

== Career ==
In 1923, Gallman became a diplomatic secretary at the Embassy of the United States, Havana. He worked at the American embassies in San Jose, Quito, Riga, and Warsaw in the 1920s and 1930s. From 1935 to 1938, he was the American consul general in the Free City of Danzig. During World War II he was deputy chief of mission at the Embassy of the United States, London. He became the American ambassador to Poland in 1948, and to South Africa in 1951.

President Harry S. Truman appointed Gallman as the ambassador to the Polish People's Republic on July 7, 1948, and he served from October 15, 1948, to July 8, 1950. Truman appointed him as ambassador to the Union of South Africa on August 22, 1951, and he served from October 18, 1951, to August 15, 1954.

President Dwight D. Eisenhower appointed Gallman as the ambassador to the Kingdom of Iraq on July 2, 1954. He presented his credentials on November 3, 1954, but had to present his credentials again on September 22, 1958, after the formation of the Arab Federation. His mission ended on December 14, 1958. He was Director General of the Foreign Service from November 17, 1958, to January 31, 1961. He published Iraq Under General Nuri in 1964.

== Personal life ==
Gallman died in Washington, D.C. on June 28, 1980.

== Works cited ==
=== News ===
- "Waldemar J. Gallman, Ex-Ambassador, Dies at 81". New York Times. October 12, 1980. p. B15. Archived from the original on June 22, 2025.

=== Web ===
- "Waldemar John Gallman (1899–1980)". Office of the Historian. Archived from the original on June 22, 2025.
