= Bradford R. Wood =

American politician

Bradford Ripley Wood
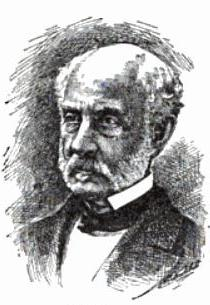

United States Minister to Denmark
- In office March 22, 1861 – November 15, 1865
- President: Abraham Lincoln; Andrew Johnson
- Preceded by: James M. Buchanan
- Succeeded by: Samuel J. Kirkwood

Member of the U.S. House of Representatives from New York's 13th district
- In office March 4, 1845 – March 3, 1847
- Preceded by: Chesselden Ellis
- Succeeded by: John I. Slingerland

Personal details
- Born: September 3, 1800 Westport, Connecticut, U.S.
- Died: September 26, 1889 (aged 89) Albany, New York, U.S.
- Resting place: Albany Rural Cemetery, New York, U.S.
- Party: Democratic
- Other political affiliations: Republican

Bradford Ripley Wood (September 3, 1800 – September 26, 1889) was a U.S. representative from New York.

== Early life and legal career ==
Born in Westport, Connecticut, Wood attended the common schools and in 1824 he graduated from Union College in Schenectady, New York. He was engaged in teaching delivering lectures on temperance and other topics, and later studied law with Robert Lansing and Harmanus Bleecker. After studying at the Litchfield Law School Wood attained admission to the bar in 1827 and commenced practice in Albany, New York.

On May 29, 1827, Wood was made solicitor in the New York Court of Chancery. He became a counselor in the New York Supreme Court in 1835 and in the United States Supreme Court in 1845. He served as a member of the Albany County board of supervisors in 1844.

== Political career ==
Wood was elected as a Democrat to the Twenty-ninth Congress (March 4, 1845 – March 3, 1847). He was an unsuccessful candidate for reelection in 1846 to the Thirtieth Congress. He served as president of the Young Men's Temperance Society in 1851. He also served as trustee of Union College, Williams College, and the Albany Law School, and was vice president of the Albany Medical College.

Wood was one of the founders of the Republican Party in New York State in 1855, and ran for the New York Court of Appeals in November 1855 on the Republican ticket. He was also vice president of the American Home Missionary Society, and founded of the First Congregational Church in Albany. He served as United States Minister to Denmark from 1861 to 1865. He died in Albany, New York on September 26, 1889, and was interred in Albany Rural Cemetery, New York.

== See also ==
- United States Congress. "Bradford R. Wood (id: W000692)". Biographical Directory of the United States Congress.

Political offices
Preceded by James M. Buchanan	United States Ambassador to Denmark; 1861–1865	Succeeded by Samuel J. Kirkwood
U.S. House of Representatives
Preceded by Chesselden Ellis	Member of the U.S. House of Representatives from New York's 13th congressional district 1845–1847	Succeeded by John I. Slingerland
