= Charles Payson =

American diplomat (1837–1913)

Charles Payson (May 2, 1837 – July 11, 1913), of Massachusetts, was a United States diplomat. He served as United States Third Assistant Secretary of State from June 22, 1878 to June 30, 1881.

Payson was born in Messina, Sicily on May 2, 1837.

In 1881, United States Secretary of State James G. Blaine removed Payson from office so that his son, Walker Blaine, could become Third Secretary. At that time, Payson became U.S. Chargé d'Affaires to Denmark, holding that office from August 12, 1881 to February 23, 1882.

After the ending of Payson's diplomatic duties in 1882, the Paysons lived mainly in Europe. Payson died at the Hôtel Bernascon in Aix-les-Bains, France on July 11, 1913. His remains were transported to Vevey, Switzerland, where he was buried.

Payson's wife Fanny was the daughter of Governor of Wisconsin Cadwallader C. Washburn.

Government offices
Preceded by John Allen Campbell	Third Assistant Secretary of State; June 22, 1878 – June 30, 1881	Succeeded by Walker Blaine
Diplomatic posts
Preceded by Adam Badeau	United States Chargé d'Affaires to Denmark; August 12, 1881 – February 23, 1882	Succeeded by James P. Wickersham
