= Fred J. Russell =

U.S. diplomat

United States Ambassador to Denmark
- In office December 9, 1971 – November 4, 1972
- President: Richard Nixon
- Preceded by: Guilford Dudley Jr.
- Succeeded by: Philip K. Crowe

United States Secretary of the Interior
- Acting
- In office November 25, 1970 – January 29, 1971
- President: Richard Nixon
- Preceded by: Wally Hickel
- Succeeded by: Rogers Morton

Undersecretary of the Interior
- In office 1970 – February 18, 1971
- President: Richard Nixon
- Preceded by: Wally Hickel
- Succeeded by: Rogers Morton

Deputy Director of the Office of Emergency Preparedness
- In office January 28, 1969 – 1970
- President: Richard Nixon

Personal details
- Born: Fred Jesse Russell; 1916
- Died: January 9, 2007 (aged 90–91)

Fred Jesse Russell (1916 – January 9, 2007) was an American businessman and diplomat. He served as the United States Ambassador to Denmark under President Richard Nixon. In 1970, Russell was named Under Secretary for the Department of the Interior and replaced Russell E. Train. He was first named deputy director of the Office of Emergency Preparedness after his help in the 1968 Presidential Election.
