= National Association of School Superintendents =

American professional organization

The National Association of School Superintendents (NASS), is a professional organization of school superintendents in the United States. It was founded in 2009, with headquarters in Burlingame, California 94010. NASS's members are superintendents and CEO-level equivalents from school districts in every state and region of the country.

Since January 2016, NASS has been operated through a partnership with the Association of California School Administrators, which is headquartered in Sacramento, CA 95814.

== Membership ==
Membership is open to both active and retired superintendents, the chief executive officers of school districts. As of January 1, 2015, the association's website reported members in 40 states. There are nearly 20,000 school districts whose superintendents, past or present, are eligible for membership.

== Legislative Advocacy ==
NASS provides legislative advocacy at the national level.

== See also ==
- History of education in the United States
- Unified school district
