= Amaliegade 8 =

Historic building in Copenhagen, Denmark

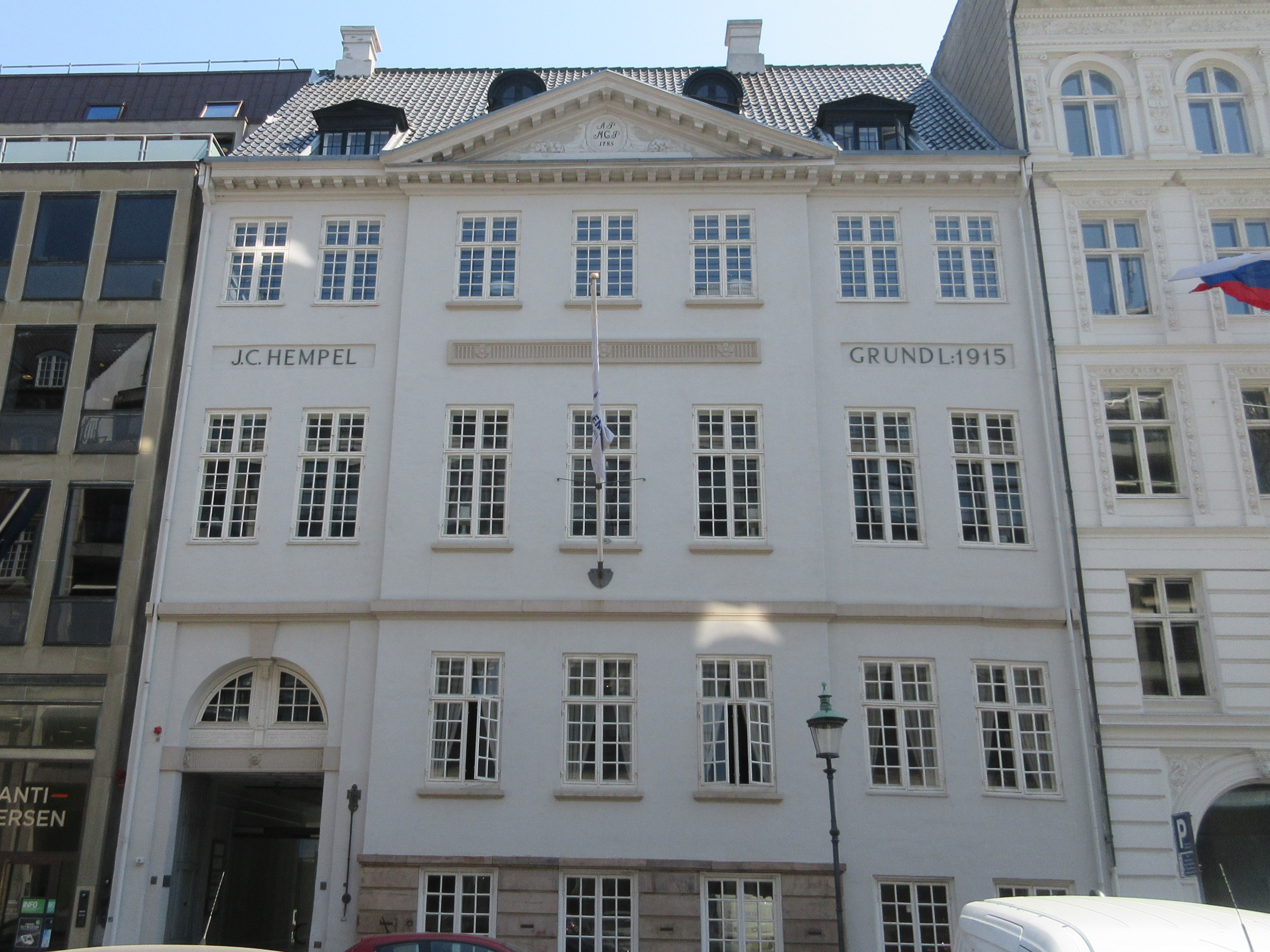
- Interactive map of the Amaliegade 8 area

General information
- Location: Copenhagen, Denmark
- Coordinates: 55°40′55.95″N 12°35′31.12″E
- Completed: 1785

Amaliegade 8 is a Neoclassical property located in the Frederiksstaden neighbourhood of central Copenhagen, Denmark. The building is from 1785 and was listed on the Danish registry of protected buildings and places in 1918. It is owned by Hempel Group and residents include the Hempel Foundation, the Mary Foundation and the Danish Financial Complaint Boards.

== History ==
=== 18th century ===
The site was initially part of a larger property which continued all the way to Ny Toldbodgade on the other side of the block. In the cadastre of 1756, it was listed as No. 61 N in St. Ann's East Quarter (Sankt Annæ Øster Kvarter). It was by then owned by Peder Gøe. On Christian Gedde's map of St. Ann's East Quarter from 1757, the property was marked as No. 321.

The still undeveloped property was in 1768 acquired by Andreas Pfützner (1741-1793), He had back in 1876 been appointed as court master carpenter. He was in circa 1770 second time married to Martha Catharina Conradi, daughter of court master builder Johan Christian Conradi. In 1772, he bought his father-in-law's house in Bag Hovedvagten.

In 1685, Pfüzner dinally constructed a house on his empty lots in Amaliegade. The section of the property that faced Toldbodgade ( nowNo. 31) was sold to gehejmeråd Hieronimus Johann Schultze (1717-1803).

At the time of the 1787 census, No. 71 N was home to two households. Andreas and Martha Catharina Pfytzner resided in the building with a maid, a female cook and a coachman. Børre Jacobsen, a brewer and assistant at the Danish Asiatic Company, resided in the building with his four children (aged 14 to 22), a male servant, a maid and a female cook.

Pfüzner died in 1793 and the house was the following year sold to Sigfred Victor Raben Levetzau, the holder of the stamhus Restrup in Northern Jutland.

=== 19th century ===
In the new cadastre of 1756, the property was listed as No. 117. It was by then still owned by Raben Levetzou.

The portrait painter Christian Albrecht Jensen lived in the building in 1826-1830 and the military officer and politician C. F. Hansen (1788-1873) was a resident in the building from 1844 to 1847.

The property was home to 20 residents in six households residents at the 1845 census. Christian Hansen, a colonel and member of General Comissariatet (deputeret), resided in the building with his wife Lovise Hansen, two children (aged 24 and 26) and one servant. Hugo von Plessen, an official in Finantsdepartementet, resided in the building as a lodger with one servant. Johannes Johannsen, a vice admiral, resided in the building with his wife Anna Sophie Johannsen, a female cook, one male servant and one maid. Christopher Christensen Korning, a barkeeper and cellarman, resided in the building with his wife Enge Maren Nielsen, their 17-year-old foster daughter and a maid. Anna Jensen, a 64-year-old woman employed with needlework, resided in the building on her own. Lars Jensen Grundfør, a concierge and weaver, resided in the building with his wife Caroline Sehestedt and their 26-year-old daughter.

== Architecture ==
The building is seven bays wide and has a three bay median risalit tipped by a triangular pediment with an oval shield featuring the initials of the builder and his wife. The windows of the belletage are higher than those of the other floors. A seven-bay side wing extends from the rear side of the building. The building was listed on the Danish registry of protected buildings and places on 23 December 1918.

== Today ==
The building is today owned by J C Hempels Fond and the Hempel Foundation and Hempel Holding are both based in the building. The Mary Foundation, a charity established by Crown Princess Mary, is also based in the building. The Danish Financial Complaint Boards are based at No. 8B.
