= Michael Walker (diplomat) =

British diplomat

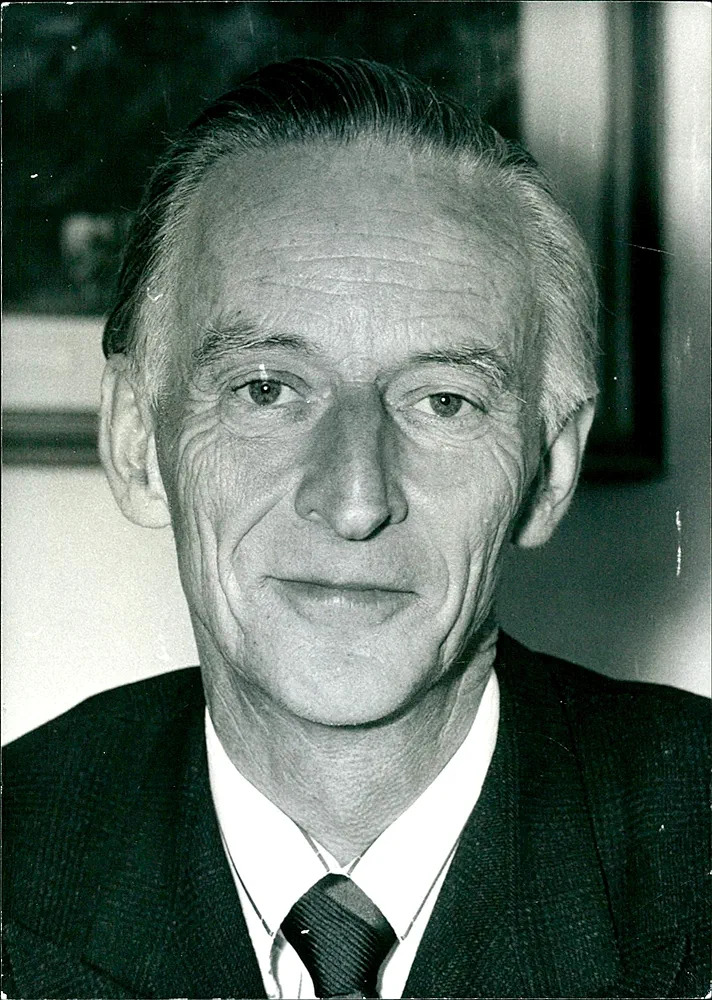

Sir (Charles) Michael Walker GCMG (22 November 1916 – 16 December 2001) was a British diplomat. He served as British High Commissioner to Ceylon, later Sri Lanka (1962–66), to Malaysia (1966–1971), and to India (1974–76).

In January 1944, as a staff officer, he represented GHQ India at an Intelligence conference in Washington. He left the Army in the rank of lieutenant-colonel in 1946 and joined the Dominions Office. Seconded to the Foreign Office, Walker soon found himself back in Washington, this time for a term as First Secretary, from 1949 to 1951.

He went to Ceylon (later Sri Lanka) as High Commissioner in 1962. Three years later, he assumed the additional role of Britain's first ambassador to the Maldive Islands, after they had gained independence in July of that year.

== Family ==
He married, in 1945, Enid McAdam, who survives him, together with their son and daughter.
