= Wickham Hoffman =

American lawyer

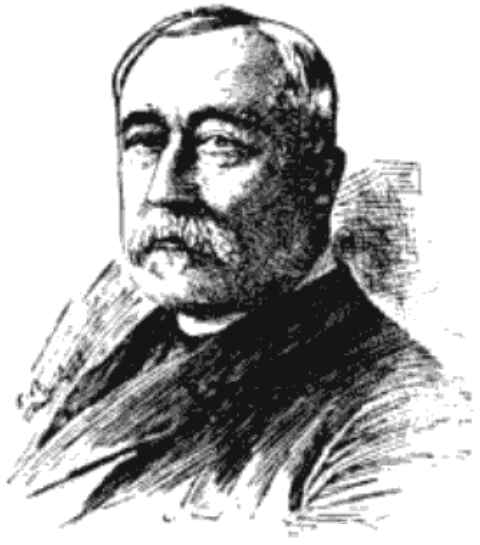
- Born: April 2, 1821; New York, New York
- Died: May 21, 1900 (aged 79); Atlantic City, New Jersey
- Resting place: Arlington National Cemetery
- Education: Harvard College
- Occupation(s): Lawyer, diplomat, military officer
- Spouse: Elizabeth Baylies (m. 1844)

Signature
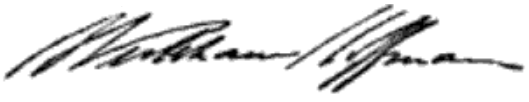

Wickham Hoffman (April 2, 1821 – May 21, 1900) was a lawyer, diplomat and Union Army Colonel.

== Biography ==
Hoffman was born in New York City to Murray Hoffman, Vice Chancellor and Associate Justice of the Supreme Court of New York and Frances Burrall.

Hoffman graduated from Harvard College in 1841. He married Elizabeth Baylies on May 14, 1844. Admitted to the New York Bar, he practiced law until the American Civil War broke out. Hoffman served in various positions during the war including Aide-de-camp to Governor Edwin D. Morgan, Inspector of New York troops at Fortress Monroe, Virginia, 1861, and Assistant Adjutant General, United States Volunteers in 1862 before being assigned to the staff of Brigadier General Thomas Williams in the expedition at Baton Rouge, Louisiana. He continued his military career by serving General William T. Sherman's staff as Assistant Adjutant General, 1862–63, and was with Major General W. B. Franklin, during the Red River Campaign, 1863. He continued to serve until 1865.

Hoffman held the following diplomatic posts:

- Assistant Secretary of Legation in Paris, France, 1866
- First Secretary of Legation in Paris, France, 1867–74
- Secretary of Legation, London, England, 1874–77,
- Secretary of Legation, St. Petersburg, Russia, 1877-83.
- United States Minister to Denmark, 1883-85.

His service in Paris coincided with the Franco-Prussian War and the Paris Commune.

He died at Atlantic City summer home May 21, 1900 after an "attack of paralysis" the day before and was buried with full military honors in Section 1 of Arlington National Cemetery.
