= James Lampton Berry =

American diplomat

James Lampton Berry (1908 - 1980) was the US Ambassador to Ceylon from November 22, 1958 to June 3, 1959 He is said to have left because he was very ill. He died in 1980, aged 71 or 72.

Berry received his bachelor’s degree in 1929 from the University of Mississippi and then studied at Yale University.
