= Milwaukee Tool =

Power tool manufacturer

Milwaukee Electric Tool Corporation

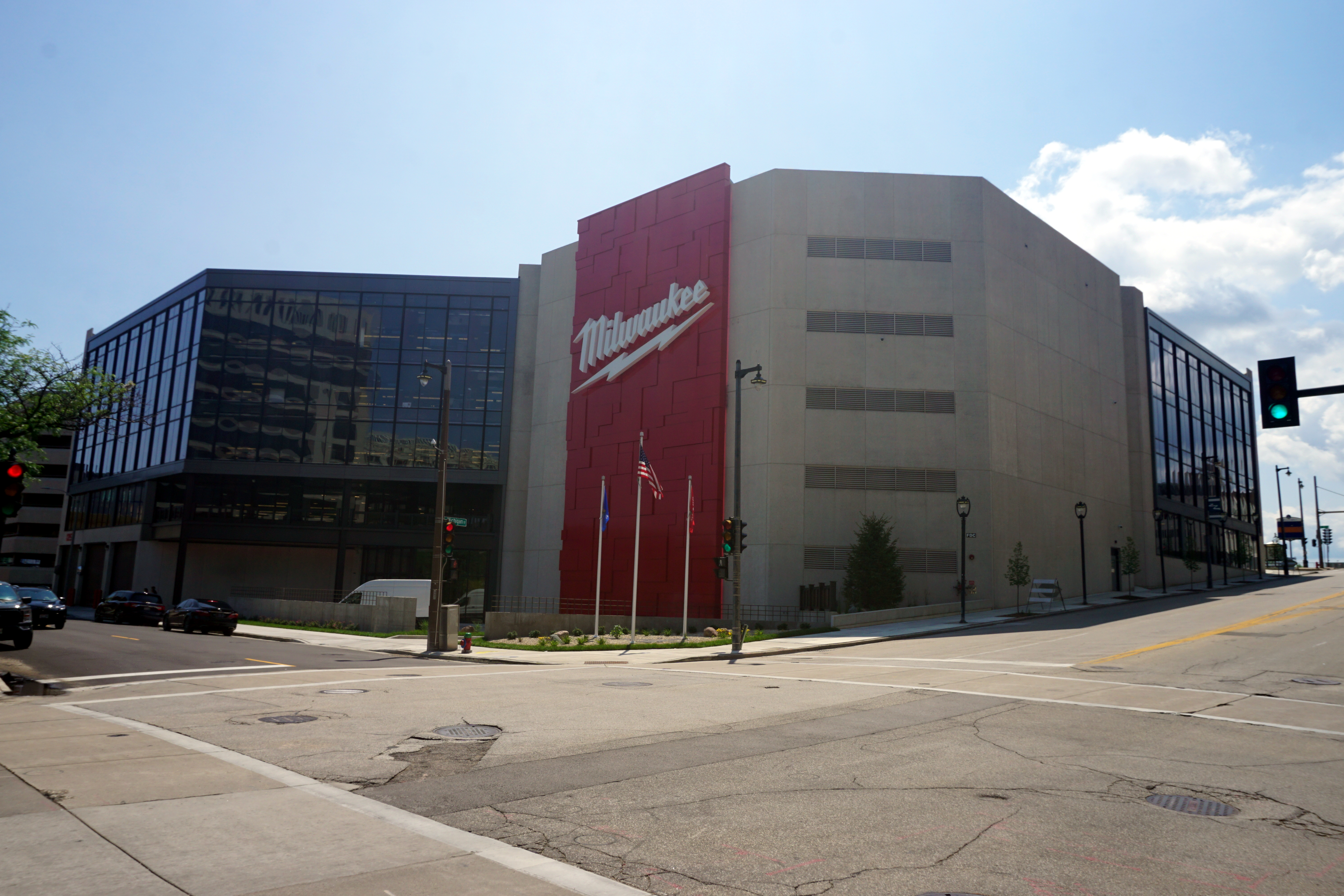
- Milwaukee Tool location in Milwaukee, WI
- Type: Subsidiary
- Industry: Manufacturing
- Founded: 1924; 102 years ago
- Founders: Albert F Siebert
- Headquarters: Brookfield, Wisconsin, United States
- Key people: Shane Moll President
- Products: Power tools, Hand tools, Accessories,
- Number of employees: 5,001-10,000
- Parent: Techtronic Industries
- Website: www.milwaukeetool.com

Milwaukee Electric Tool Corporation, known more commonly as Milwaukee Tool or simply Milwaukee, is an American multi-national company that develops, manufactures, and markets power tools, hand tools, tool accessories, tool storage, and personal protective equipment. Milwaukee Tool was last sold in 2005 for $626.6 million to the multinational holding company TTI Group. The company now operates as an independent subsidiary of TTI Group alongside brands like AEG, Ryobi, Hoover, Dirt Devil, and Vax. In 2022, $206 million was invested in Wisconsin research and development facilities.

Milwaukee tools today are manufactured globally in China, Germany, Mexico, the United States, and Vietnam. The tools produced include corded and cordless power tools, hand tools, pliers, hand saws, screwdrivers, utility knives, impact drivers, and more. Primary Milwaukee Tool product lines include the M12, M18, MX FUEL, and PACKOUT tool, equipment, and tool storage systems. The company also engages in global distribution of various other tools such as multimeters, thermal imaging equipment, oscillating multi-tools, drilling devices, chargers.

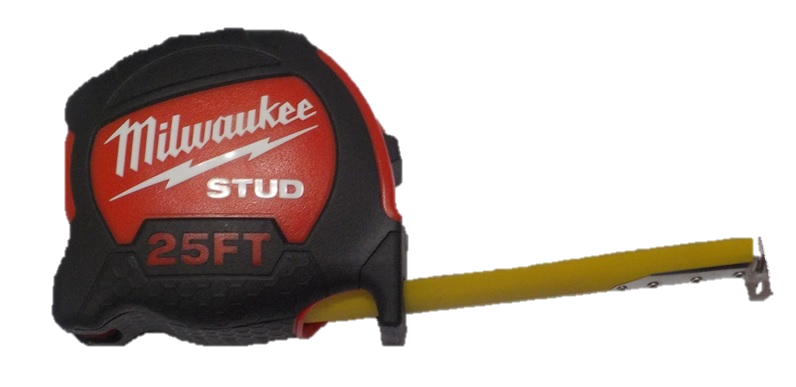
A Milwaukee tape measure

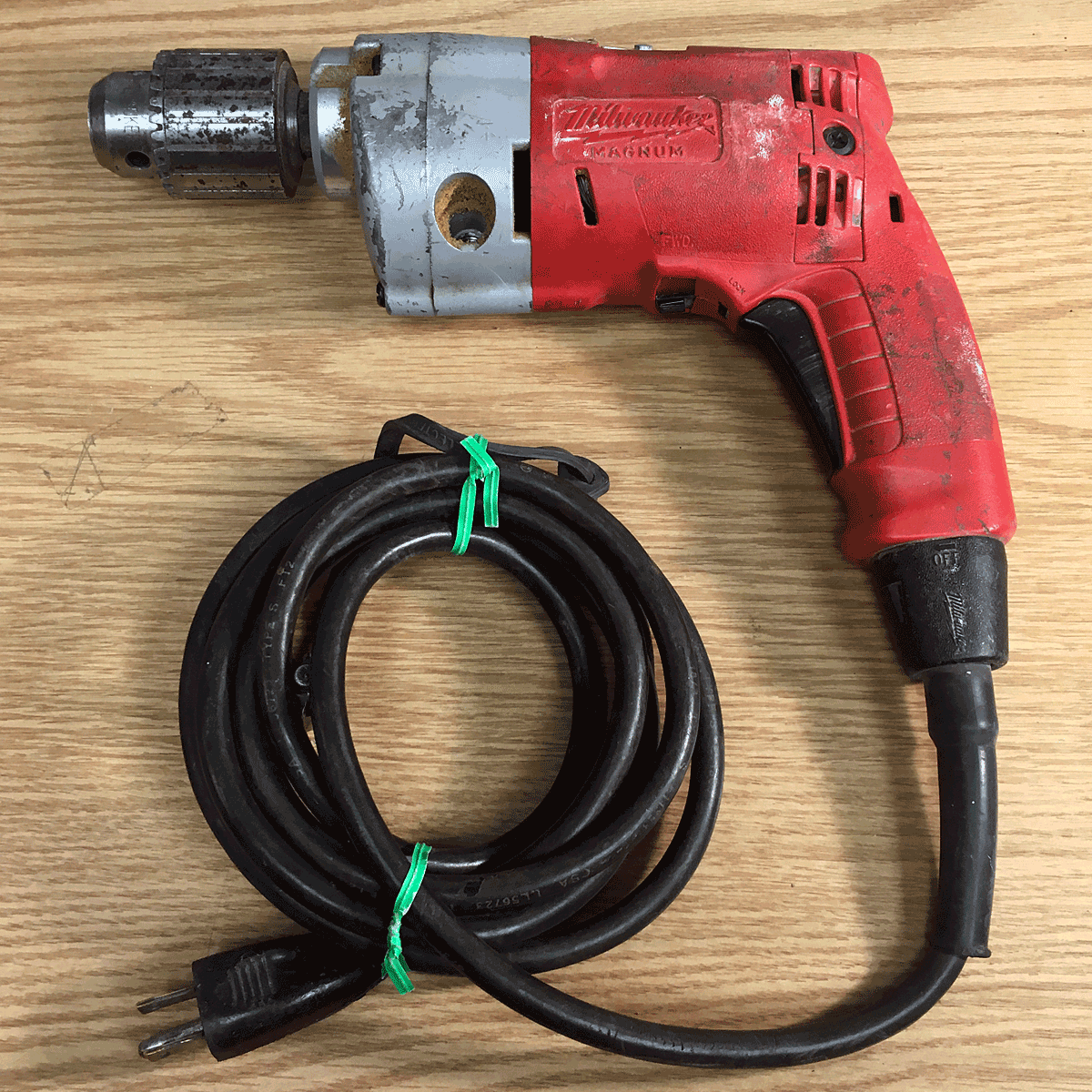
Milwaukee Magnum Holeshooter 1/2" Cat. No. 0234-1 electric drill tool

== History ==
In 1918, A.H. Peterson developed the Hole-Shooter, a portable, one-handed operation, 1/4-inch (6.4 mm) capacity power drill powered by a series-type Westinghouse motor. This drill was lighter than other models available at the time, weighing only 5 pounds (2.3 kg).

In 1922, A.H. Peterson and Albert F. Siebert founded the A.H. Peterson Company. The business closed the following year after a financial setback related to a factory-destroying fire.

In 1924, Siebert purchased the remaining company's assets and formed the Milwaukee Electric Tool Corporation.

In 1930, Milwaukee Electric Tool Corporation began producing tools for the U.S. Navy. Milwaukee Tool received an equipment specification rating for their electric drill. Milwaukee Tool then began developing portable hand grinders, electric hammers, sanders, and polishers.

In the 1960s and 1970s, Milwaukee Tool was focused on product and facility expansion.

In 1965, Milwaukee Electric Tool Corporation moved from its headquarters on State Street in Milwaukee, Wisconsin, to a 212,000-square-foot (19,700 m^{2}) facility in Brookfield, Wisconsin.

In 1974, Milwaukee Electric Tool Corporation opened a 60,000-square-foot (5,600 m^{2}) manufacturing plant in Jackson, Mississippi.

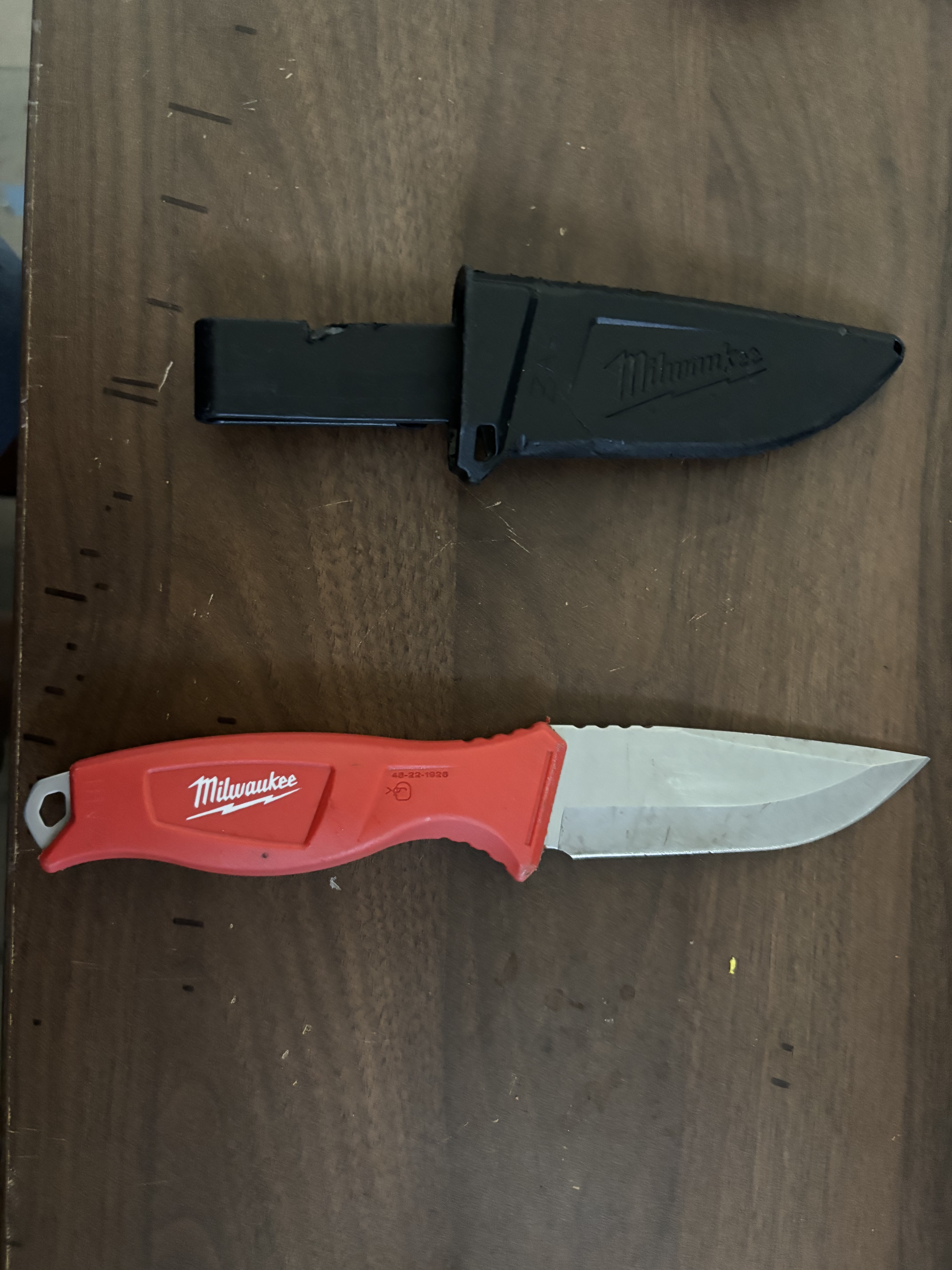
Milwaukee 4-inch (100 mm) tradesman fixed blade 48-22-1926

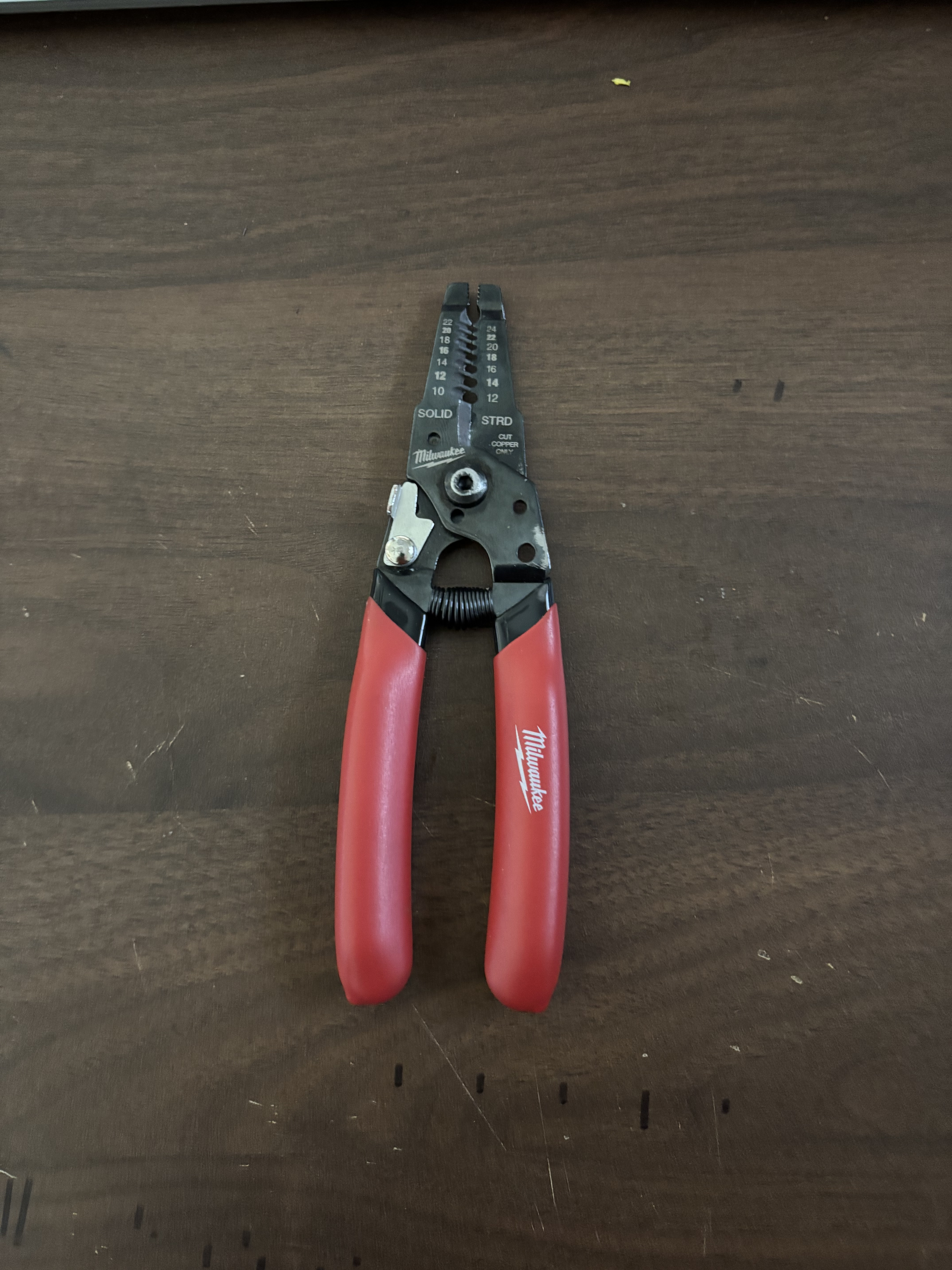
Milwaukee tool wire stripper/cutter 48-22-3043

In 1976, Milwaukee Tool was sold to Amstar. It was later sold to Merrill Lynch in 1986, Atlas Copco in 1995, and finally, Techtronic Industries in 2005.

In 2021, Milwaukee Tool opened a 150,000-square-foot (14,000 m^{2}) Service hub in Greenwood, Indiana. The $6.75M investment complemented Milwaukee Tool's 48,000-square-foot (4,500 m^{2}) service hub in Greenwood, Mississippi, as well as the company's network of factory and authorized Service centers across the United States.

In 2022, the company continued to expand the system and broadened its focus with workshop storage solutions.

In 2022, Milwaukee Tool opened a 95,000-square-foot (8,800 m^{2}) manufacturing facility in West Bend, Wisconsin for the production of hand tools, starting with pliers and screwdrivers. The company has the right of first refusal (ROFR) to purchase additional land for future expansion.

=== Foreign forced labor allegations ===
In 2023, U.S. lawmakers at the Congressional-Executive Commission on China questioned Milwaukee Tool over allegations its suppliers may have used forced Uyghur labor from Chinese prisons in the manufacture of work gloves.

In response to an earlier inquiry by the Business & Human Rights Resource Centre, Milwaukee Tool has said they do not tolerate the use of forced labor, and that they have strict policies and procedures in place to ensure that no authorized Milwaukee Tool products are manufactured using forced labor. Milwaukee Tool says they investigated the claims and found no evidence to support them.

After questioning company officials, Representative Chris Smith, Chair of the U.S. Congressional-Executive Commission on China, said that Milwaukee Tool ultimately discovered multiple examples of counterfeit gloves bearing their brand name being made in China, and cut ties with the manufacturer in question.

Milwaukee Tool has been accused in US courts of benefitting from forced labor assignments in Chinese prisons, with former prisoner Lee Ming-che recalling being forcibly tasked with gluing a patch bearing Milwaukee Tool's distinctive lightning bolt onto its leather work gloves while incarcerated in Hunan's Chishan Prison.

=== Production development ===
- In 1935, Milwaukee Electric Tool Corporation developed a lightweight 3/4-inch (19 mm) electric hammer drill. This power tool was designed to drill and sink anchors into concrete. This drill could also be converted into a standard 3/4-inch (19 mm) drill. Milwaukee also designed an easy-to-handle, single-horsepower sander/grinder that weighed only 15 pounds (6.8 kg).
- In 1949, Milwaukee Electric Tool Corporation added a spring clutch to handheld Milwaukee sanders, grinders, and circular saws, significantly reducing tool recoil. In the same year, Milwaukee Tool also introduced their 1/2-inch (13 mm) right-angle drill. This power tool allowed plumbers and electricians to drill holes in wood and steel.
- In 1951, Milwaukee Electric Tool Corporation released its Milwaukee Sawzall reciprocating saw. The Sawzall was the first portable hacksaw to have a reciprocating mechanism. Milwaukee Tool also developed a full line of saw blades that were capable of cutting all materials.
- In the 1970s, Milwaukee Tool released the Hole Hawg, a power tool designed for drilling large holes in studs and joints. The company also released the Magnum Hole-Shooter, a 1/2-inch (13 mm) pistol drill, and became the first American manufacturer to produce a 4 1/2-inch (110 mm) angle grinder.
- In 1991, Milwaukee released the Milwaukee Super Sawzall, a reciprocating saw with built-in counterbalance, a gear-protecting clutch, and five different patents. In the late 1990s, Milwaukee Electric Tool Corporation released a new range of miter saws and a lineup of 18-volt contractor cordless tools.
- In 2012, the company developed its Milwaukee M18 FUEL product line. The tools specified as M18 tools included angle grinders, circular saws, impact wrenches, brad nail guns, and deep-cut band saws. This designation was introduced to indicate a products use of a Milwaukee REDLITHIUM battery (which was released in 2010).
- In 2017, Milwaukee Tool launched its Packout modular storage system, starting with 5 tool boxes and 3 tool bags.
