= Oreck =

Oreck is a surname. Notable people with the surname include:

- Bruce J. Oreck (born 1953), American politician
- David Oreck (1923–2023), American entrepreneur, business salesman, and lecturer, father of Bruce
- Don Oreck (1930—2006), American actor
- Sharon Oreck (born 1955), American film, music video and commercial producer

Oreck may also refer to the Oreck brand of vacuum cleaners or its manufacturer, the Oreck Corporation, started by David Oreck.

== See also ==
- Reck
