= Carl Rowan =

American diplomat and journalist (1925–2000)

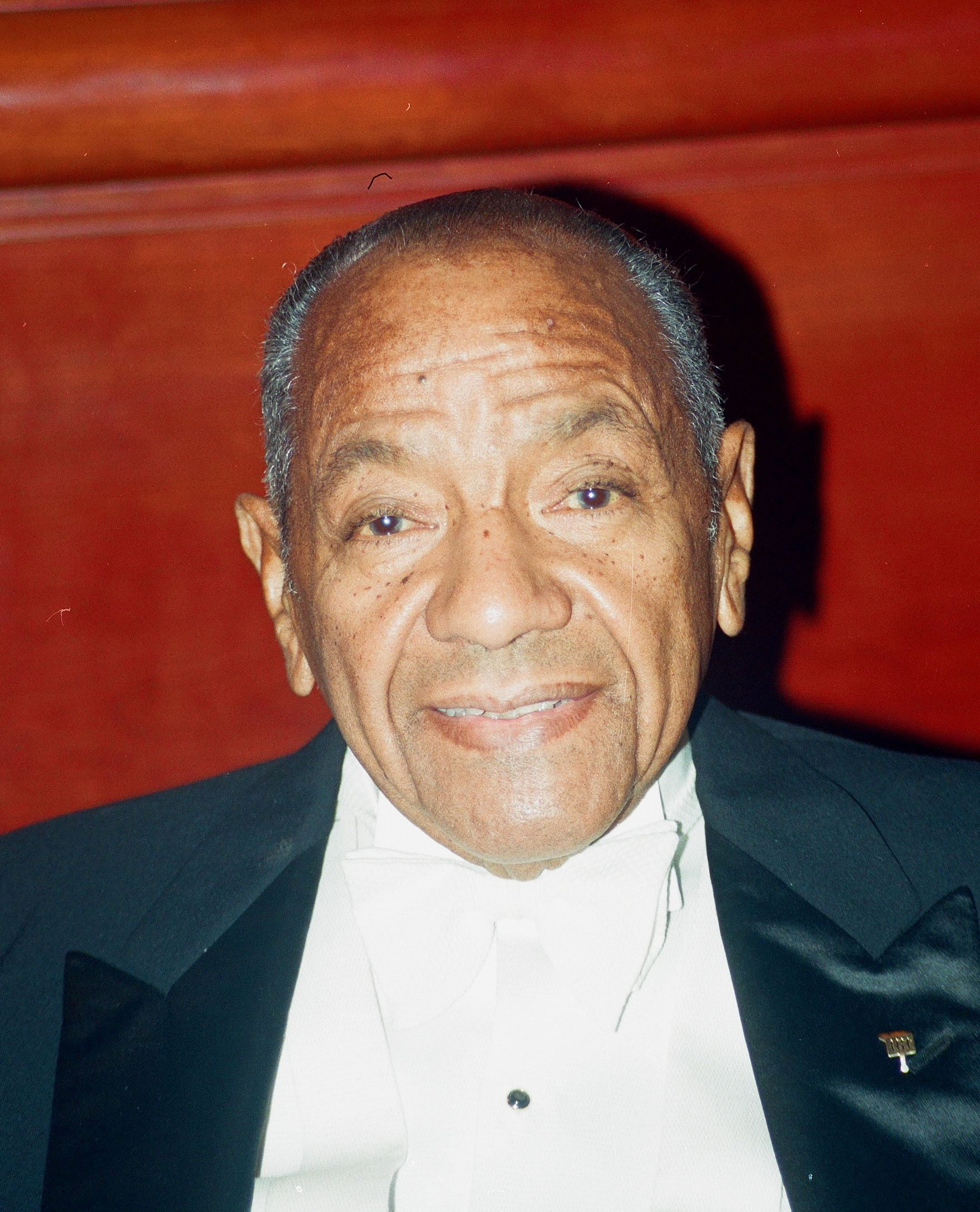
- Rowan in 1997

5th Director of the United States Information Agency
- In office February 27, 1964 – July 10, 1965
- President: Lyndon B. Johnson
- Preceded by: Edward R. Murrow
- Succeeded by: Leonard Harold Marks

United States Ambassador to Finland
- In office March 9, 1963 – February 8, 1964
- President: John F. Kennedy; Lyndon B. Johnson
- Preceded by: Bernard Gufler
- Succeeded by: Tyler Thompson

Personal details
- Born: August 11, 1925 Ravenscroft, Tennessee, U.S.
- Died: September 23, 2000 (aged 75) Washington, D.C., U.S.
- Spouse: Vivien
- Children: 3
- Education: Tennessee State University; Washburn University; Oberlin College; University of Minnesota (M.A.)
- Occupation: Journalist, author, diplomat

Military service
- Allegiance: United States
- Branch/service: United States Navy
- Years of service: 1944–1946
- Rank: Ensign
- Battles/wars: World War II

Carl Thomas Rowan (August 11, 1925 – September 23, 2000) was an American journalist, author and government official whose columns were syndicated across the U.S. At one point, he was the highest ranking African American in the United States government.

== Early life ==
Carl Rowan was born in Ravenscroft, Tennessee, the son of Johnnie, a cook and cleaner, and Thomas Rowan, who stacked lumber. He was raised in McMinnville, Tennessee, during the Great Depression. Rowan was determined to get a good education. He graduated from the Bernard School in 1942, as class president and valedictorian. After graduating from high school, Rowan worked cleaning porches at a tuberculosis hospital in order to attend Tennessee State College in Nashville. He studied at Tennessee State University (1942–43) and Washburn University (1943–44). He was one of the first African Americans to serve as a commissioned officer in the United States Navy.

== Journalism career ==
He graduated from Oberlin College (1947) and was awarded a master's degree in journalism from the University of Minnesota (1948). He began his career in journalism writing for the African-American newspapers Minneapolis Spokesman and St. Paul Recorder (the Minnesota Spokesman-Recorder since 2000). He went on to be a copywriter for The Minneapolis Tribune (1948–50), and later became a staff writer (1950–61), reporting extensively on the Civil Rights Movement.

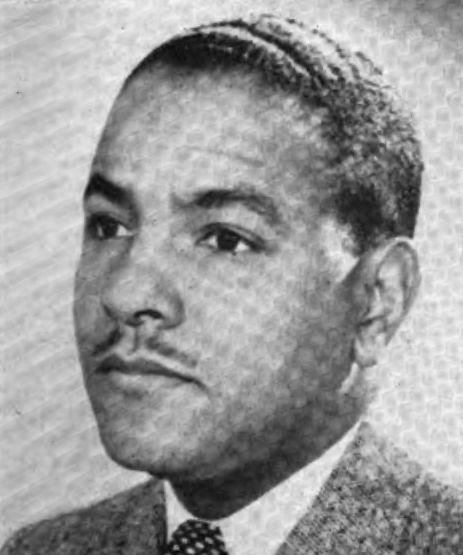
Rowan c. 1954

In a 1964 interview with Robert Penn Warren for the book Who Speaks for the Negro?, Rowan reflected on his reporting of the civil rights movement, as well as his opinions on the distinctions between the North and the South, prejudices and persecution, and African Americans' political power.

From 1966 to 1998, Rowan wrote a syndicated column for the Chicago Sun-Times and, from 1967 to 1996, was a panelist on a television program Agronsky & Company, later called Inside Washington; Rowan's demeanor presented the appearance of a fair opponent whose arguments were persuasive and well-balanced—he always came across as the voice of reason.

=== Montgomery bus boycott ===
During the 1950s, Rowan covered the burgeoning civil rights movement in the South, including the 1955 Montgomery bus boycott in Alabama, resulting from Rosa Parks's refusal to relinquish her bus seat to a white passenger. As the only black reporter covering the story for a national newspaper, Rowan struck a special friendship with the boycott's leaders, including Martin Luther King Jr. When news of an unlikely compromise settlement of the boycott came to Rowan's attention across the Associated Press wire, he notified King, who made quick steps to discredit the story, about to appear in a Montgomery newspaper, thus ensuring the continuance of the boycott.

== Government involvement ==
In 1954, Rowan was asked by the State Department to go on a speaking tour across India. He later gave other speaking tours through South and Southeast Asia. These speaking tours were part of U.S. Cold War propaganda efforts which funded leading American figures lecturing abroad. Rowan was selected to speak in India because of their criticism of U.S. treatment of African Americans.

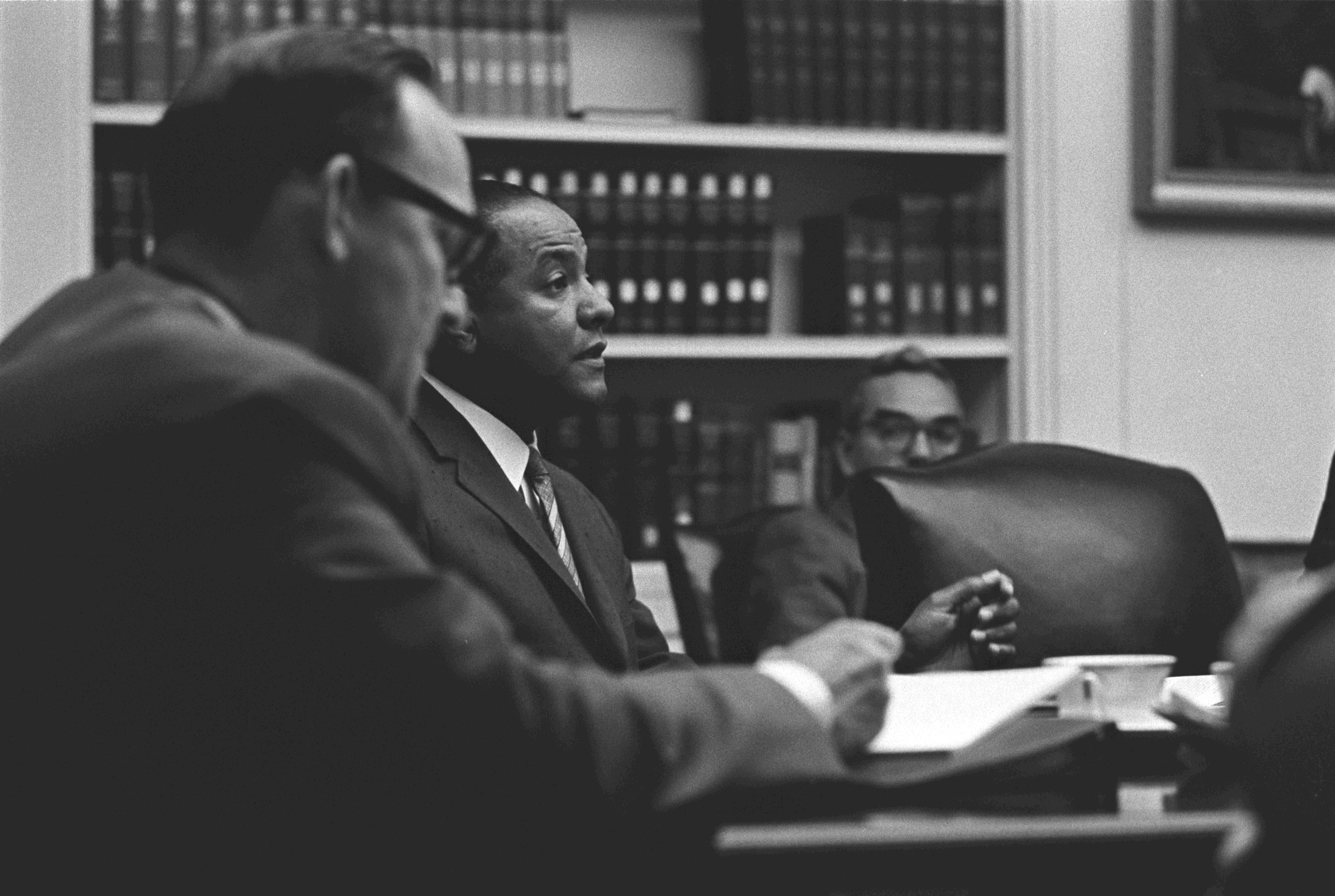
Rowan speaking at a National Security meeting on Vietnam in the Cabinet Room of the White House, July 1965

In 1961, Rowan was appointed Deputy Assistant Secretary of State by President John F. Kennedy. The following year, he served as a delegate to the United Nations during the Cuban Missile Crisis. Rowan became the U.S. Ambassador to Finland in 1963. In 1964, Rowan was appointed director of the United States Information Agency (USIA) by President Lyndon B. Johnson. In serving as director of the USIA, Rowan became the first African American to hold a seat on the National Security Council and the highest level African American in the United States government.

His name appeared on the master list of Nixon political opponents.

== Legacy and death ==
In 1960, Rowan was denied membership to a club on the grounds that it was racially segregated; this subsequently inspired Joe Glazer to write the song "I Belong to a Private Club".

Carl Rowan was a well-known and highly decorated journalist. His columns were published in more than one hundred newspapers across the United States. In 1968 he received the Elijah Parish Lovejoy Award as well as an honorary Doctor of Laws degree from Colby College. In 1997, he was awarded the Spingarn Medal from the NAACP. Rowan was a 1995 Pulitzer Prize finalist for his commentaries. He is the only journalist in history to win the Sigma Delta Chi medallion for journalistic excellence in three successive years.

Thurgood Marshall's only interview while serving on the Supreme Court of the United States was for Carl Rowan's 1988 documentary. The National Press Club gave Rowan its 1999 Fourth Estate Award for lifetime achievement. On January 9, 2001, United States Secretary of State Madeleine Albright dedicated the press briefing room at the State Department as the Carl T. Rowan Briefing room.

Rowan died in Washington on September 23, 2000, of heart and kidney ailments in the intensive care unit at Washington Hospital Center. Rowan was 75 and had diabetes prior to his death.

Rowan was survived by his wife, Vivien; the three children they shared: two sons and one daughter; and four grandchildren. Rowan’s two sons are Carl Jr., a lawyer; and Jeffrey, a clinical psychologist. His daughter, Barbara Rowan Jones, is a formal journalist like her father.

== Project Excellence ==
Founded in 1987 by Rowan, Project Excellence was a college scholarship program for black high-school seniors who displayed outstanding writing and speaking skills. Rowan founded Project Excellence to combat negative peer pressure felt by black students and to reward students who rose above stereotypes and negative peer influence and excelled academically. Chaired by Rowan, a committee of journalists, community leaders, and school officials oversaw the program. Participants were African-American students in their senior year of high school from public, private, and parochial schools in the metropolitan Washington area, including the Virginia and Maryland suburbs. By 2000 the program had given out $26 million in scholarship money to over 1150 students.

== Shooting controversy ==
Rowan gained public notoriety on June 14, 1988, when he shot an unarmed teenage trespasser, Ben Smith. "The interloper was a near-naked teenager who had been skinny-dipping with friends in Rowan's pool, and the columnist's weapon was an unregistered, and thus illegal, .22 caliber pistol."

From People magazine: "When Rowan heard the police arrive, he stepped outside to let them in. It was then, he says, that he was confronted by "a tall man who was smoking something that I absolutely was sure was marijuana." Rowan says he repeatedly warned the intruder that he was armed and would shoot. "My first words were: 'Freeze! Stay where you are!' " says Rowan. "Then I said, 'I have a gun.' " Rowan says the man kept coming and that he finally felt forced to shoot in self-defense. He says he aimed at the intruder's feet but hit him in the wrist when the man lunged forward.

The intruder, teenager Benjamin Smith, 18, of Chevy Chase, Maryland, tells a different story. "I was in my underwear," he told a radio interviewer. "I just climbed out of the pool. It was pretty innocent. I never spoke with him. He just shot me and closed the door and went back hiding in his house. I mean, I guess I was trespassing. But that's no reason to shoot a person, is it? For swimming in their pool?"

Rowan was charged for firing a gun that he did not legally own. Rowan was arrested and tried. During the trial, he argued that he had the right to use whatever means necessary to protect himself and his family. He also said the pistol he used was exempt from the District's handgun prohibition law because it belonged to his older son, a former FBI agent. He was accused of hypocrisy, since Rowan was a strict gun control advocate. In a 1981 column, he advocated "a law that says anyone found in possession of a handgun except a legitimate officer of the law goes to jail—period." In 1985, he called for "A complete and universal federal ban on the sale, manufacture, importation and possession of handguns (except for authorized police and military personnel).

Rowan was tried but the jury was deadlocked; the judge declared a mistrial and he was never retried. In his autobiography, Rowan said he still favors gun control, but admits being vulnerable to a charge of hypocrisy.

== Bibliography ==
External videos
- Booknotes interview with Rowan on Breaking Barriers February 3, 1991, C-SPAN

- South of Freedom (1952)
- The Pitiful and the Proud (1956)
- Go South to Sorrow (1957)
- Wait till Next Year: The Life Story of Jackie Robinson (1960)
- Just Between Us Blacks (1974)
- Breaking Barriers: A Memoir (1991)
- Growing up Black: From The Slave Days to the Present - 25 African-Americans Reveal the Trials and Triumphs of Their Childhoods (contributor, 1992)
- Dream Makers, Dream Breakers: The World of Justice Thurgood Marshall (1993)
- The Coming Race War in America: A Wake-Up Call (1996)

== Notes ==
Diplomatic posts
Preceded by Bernard Gufler	United States Ambassador to Finland; 1963–1964	Succeeded by Tyler Thompson
