= Dirt Devil =

Brand name of floor care products

- Genre: Home care
- Founded: 1905; 121 years ago (as P. A. Geier Company)
- Products: Vacuums, carpet machines, canister vacuums, hand vacs, stick vacs, steam cleaners
- Owner: TTI Floor Care North America
- Parent: Techtronic Industries
- Website: www.dirtdevil.com

Dirt Devil is a brand name originally introduced in 1981 by the Royal Appliance Manufacturing Co, an American vacuum cleaner and floor care company. The company and the brand are now owned by TTI Floor Care North America, a subsidiary of Hong Kong–based Techtronic Industries, who also own Oreck, Vax, and Hoover North America.

== Royal Appliance Manufacturing Company ==
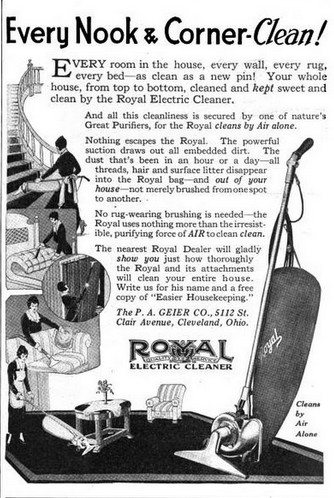
Advertisement for P.A.Geier Ltd Royal Electric Cleaner, from Woman's Home Companion, 1919

The origins of the Dirt Devil brand can be traced back to a company founded in 1905 as the Royal Appliance Manufacturing Company, selling the 'Royal Sweeper' from premises on Cochran Road in Solon, Ohio. At about the same time Philip Geier started the as "P. A. Geier Co" also in Cleveland, Ohio, and around 1910 when they started building vacuum cleaners he bought the rights to the Royal name. Their first hand-held vacuum cleaner the "Royal Prince" (Model 157) was introduced in 1937, and by 1953 the company was renamed the "Royal Appliance Manufacturing Co", producing vacuum cleaners, mixers, hair dryers, and washing machines.

In 1984, Royal introduced the Dirt Devil Hand Vac, to compete as a lower-cost, mass-market alternative to the existing Royal Prince line of all-metal hand vacuums, as well to compete with the Black & Decker DustBuster. Originally named "Royal Dirt Devil", the company made "Dirt Devil" the primary brand name; the line eventually evolved to include more models, including upright vacuum cleaners, most with distinctive red plastic cases.

In 2003, Royal Appliance Mfg. Co. was sold to Techtronic Industries of Hong Kong. Their sub-division TTI Floor Care now also owns Hoover (North America), Oreck, and Vax.

== Historical products ==
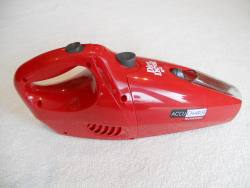
Dirt Devil AccuCharge handheld vacuum cleaner

- Dirt Devil Hand Vac – Introduced in 1984, and selling over 23 million units by 2004.
- Dirt Devil Broom Vac (corded) – debuted 1987
- Dirt Devil Broom Vac (cordless, rechargeable)

=== Slogans ===
- "Nothing escapes the power of a Dirt Devil" (1995–2005)
- "Fight Dirty" (2005–2014)
- "Let's Go" (Since 2013)

== The UK company ==
Dirt Devil products made for UK mains voltage (230v AC), can still be found in limited quantities in some online marketplaces and second-hand shops. The Dirt Devil Web site in January 2026 stated "The Devil is back". Dirt Devil UK was part of Pulse Home Products Ltd, registered as commission agents involved in the sale of furniture, household goods, hardware and ironmongery in the UK and Ireland. Pulse (and therefore also Dirt Devil) was owned by Alba from 2001 to 2007. Pulse Home Products Ltd entered voluntary liquidation on 1 August 2023, and was dissolved on 2 June 2024.
