= Orrick =

Orrick may refer to:

== People ==
- Andrew Downey Orrick (1917–2008), attorney
- J. Smith Orrick (died 1930), American politician
- William Horsley Orrick Jr. (1915–2003), federal judge
- William Orrick III (1953–), federal judge

== Other ==
- Orrick, Missouri
- Orrick, Herrington & Sutcliffe, a U.S. law firm

== See also ==
- Oreck
- Orick (disambiguation)
