= Howard Brodie =

Howard Brodie may refer to:

- Howard Brodie (diplomat) (fl. from 1990), U.S. ambassador to Finland
- Howard Brodie (sketch artist) (1915–2010), American sketch artist
