= Charles C. Adams Jr. =

American diplomat (born 1947)

Charles Adams
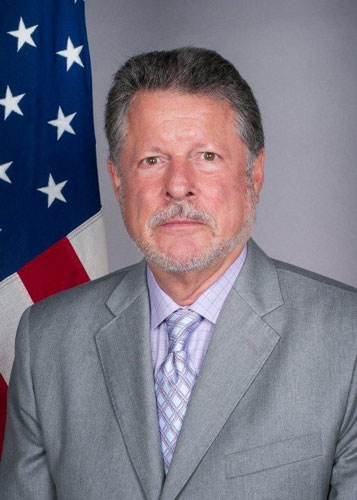
- Official portrait, 2015

United States Ambassador to Finland
- In office December 8, 2015 – January 20, 2017
- President: Barack Obama
- Preceded by: Bruce Oreck
- Succeeded by: Robert Pence

Personal details
- Born: Charles Clarence Adams Jr. August 25, 1947 (age 79) Belfast, Northern Ireland
- Party: Democratic
- Education: Dartmouth College (BA); University of Virginia (JD)

Charles Clarence Adams Jr. (born August 25, 1947) is a British-born American diplomat, international arbitration lawyer, and former United States Ambassador to Finland. Prior to his diplomatic service, he practiced international arbitration in Geneva, Switzerland, and served as co-chair of Americans Abraod for Obama, a Democratic Party fundraising and networking organization for Americans living overseas.

He also served as a member of the National Finance Committee of the 2012 Barack Obama presidential campaign, a position he also held during the 2008 Obama campaign.

He was nominated Ambassador to Finland by President Barack Obama in July 2014 and was confirmed by the U.S. Senate on June 24, 2015. He presented his credentials on December 8, 2015, and served until January 20, 2017.

In 2017, Adams became a non-executive director at the Nordic West Office in Finland.

== Early life ==
Adams was born in Belfast, Northern Ireland, one of six children of Charles C. Adams, a career diplomat with the U.S. State Department, and the former Florence Schneider of Brooklyn, New York. He was raised in the countries of his father's assignments, including Canada, France, Germany, Ghana, Morocco and Senegal, as well as the Washington, D.C. area.

He attended Dartmouth College and received his Bachelor of Arts degree in 1968. From 1968 to 1970, he was a Peace Corps volunteer, serving in Kenya. Following the Peace Corps, he attended law school at University of Virginia, receiving his J.D. degree in 1973.

== Career ==
Adams began practicing international law in Washington, D.C., and moved to Paris before establishing residence in Geneva in 1986.

Currently, Adams was a partner at Orrick, Herrington & Sutcliffe, an international law firm based in the United States. He led the firm's international arbitration practice, with a focus on high-value disputes, and served as head of the firm's Geneva office. His practice included major infrastructure and construction projects, joint venture agreements, intellectual property, insurance, energy, manufacturing, telecommunications and transportation industries.

He occasionally serves on international arbitration panels, and appears frequently on various news media outlets, commenting on U.S. political issues.

Notable publications include English Supreme Court Upholds Party Autonomy in International Arbitration, which examined a 2011 British high court decision which called into question tenets of impartiality when setting up international arbitration panels. In 2012, Adams provided historical roots and context to current issues in an article titled The State of Arbitration, published by a leading international professional journal. In an article published in early 2013, Adams makes a case that as costs rise, Switzerland is an ideal location to conduct international arbitration. "The domestic courts take a hands-off approach, and the non-intrusion...is certainly a benefit. There is also a well developed infrastructure in place and compared to other centers such as London or Paris it is perhaps surprisingly lower in cost," he said.

== Boards ==
He serves as Executive-in-Residence and on the board of advisers of the Taylor Institute, a research and post-graduate study center of Franklin University Switzerland.

He also serves on the board of advisers of End Human Trafficking Now, a human rights group. He is a past president of the International Center for Humanitarian Reporting, located in Cambridge, Massachusetts.

He is a member of the board of trustees of the Dubai International Arbitration Centre, an initiative of the Dubai Chamber of Commerce and Industry.

He is a frequent guest lecturer at the International Development Law Organization, the University of Geneva and other institutions of legal education.

He serves as a Member of the Board of Advisors of the Global Panel Foundation, an NGO that works behind the scenes in crisis areas around the world.

Diplomatic posts
Preceded by Bruce Oreck	United States Ambassador to Finland; 2015–2017	Succeeded by Robert Pence
