= Doug Hickey =

American businessman and diplomat

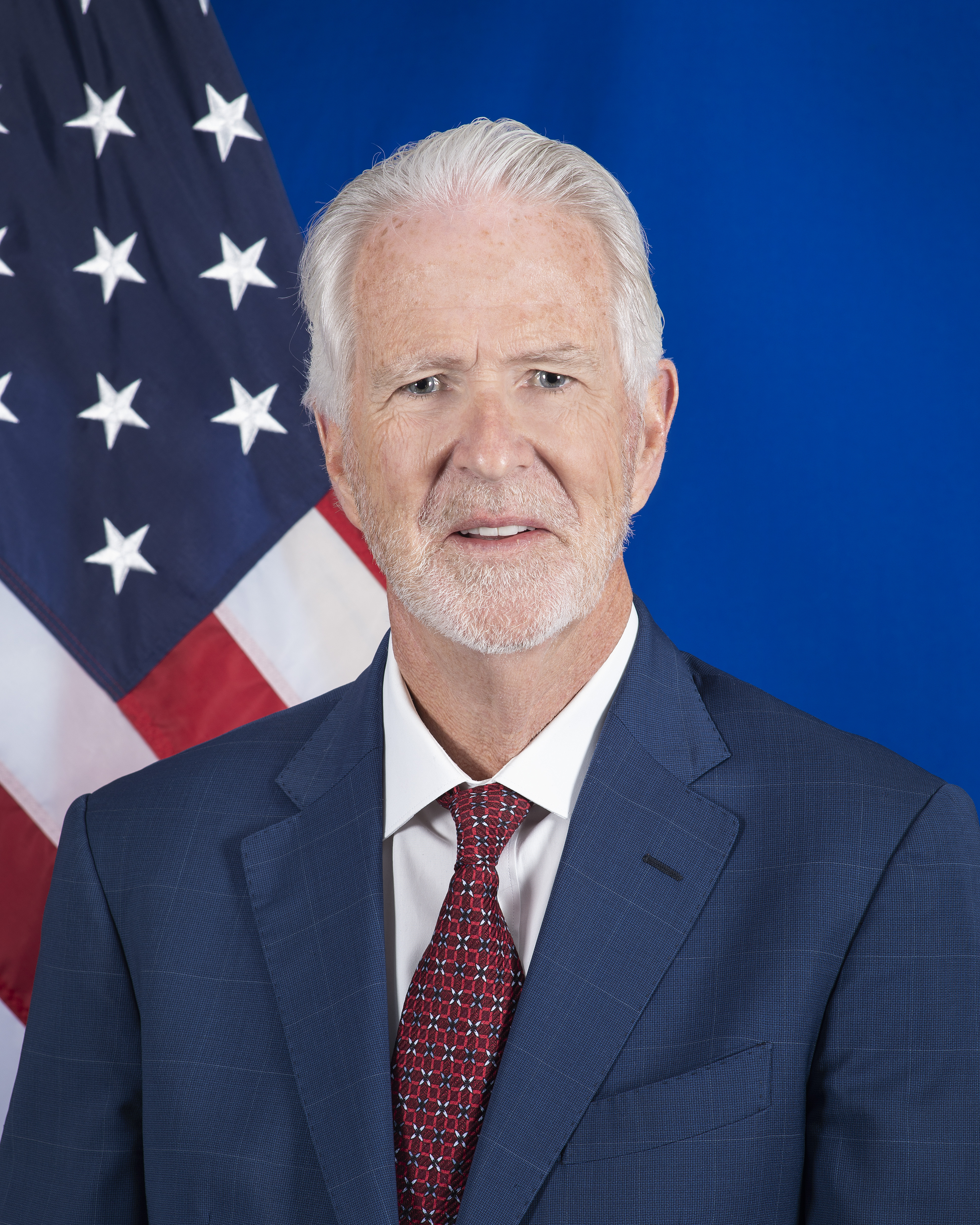

United States Ambassador to Finland
- In office May 11, 2022 – September 20, 2024
- President: Joe Biden
- Preceded by: Robert Pence
- Succeeded by: Howard Brodie

Personal details
- Born: Douglas Thomas Hickey
- Party: Democratic
- Spouse: Dawn Ross
- Education: Siena College (BA)

Douglas Thomas Hickey is an American businessman and diplomat who served as the United States ambassador to Finland from 2022 to 2024. He has more than 30 years of operational experience holding senior-level positions in the telecom, internet, and technology industries.

== Education ==
Hickey earned a Bachelor of Arts degree in economics in 1977 from Siena College.

== Career ==
From 1989 to 1994, Hickey was the president of Metropolitan Fiber Systems. He later joined GlobalCenter, a web hosting service, before it was acquired by Exodus Communications. From 1998 until his resignation in 2001, Hickey was the president and CEO of Critical Path, Inc. From 2000 to 2010, Hickey was a partner at Hummer Winblad Venture Partners in San Francisco. He was later the president and CEO of BinWise, Inc., a company that provides software used to track beer, spirits, and wine inventory to businesses in the food and beverage industry.

In 2014, Hickey was appointed to serve as the United States Ambassador and commissioner general to Expo Milano by President Barack Obama.

=== Ambassador to Finland ===
Despite initial reports that President Joe Biden was considering to nominate him as Ambassador to Italy and San Marino, he was eventually nominated as Ambassador to Finland on October 8, 2021.

Hearings on Hickey's nomination were held before the Senate Foreign Relations Committee on March 3, 2022. The committee favorably reported his nomination to the Senate floor on March 23, 2022. Hickey was confirmed by the entire Senate via voice vote on March 24, 2022. Because of pandemic protocols related to COVID-19, Hickey took his oath of office in Sun Valley, Idaho.

He presented his credentials to President Sauli Niinistö on May 11, 2022.

During Hickey's tenure, major developments in U.S.-Finland relations include Finland's ascension to NATO and a joint statement on U.S.-Finland Science and Technology Cooperation, including biotechnology, climate science, and health science. Hickey retired from his post on September 20, 2024.

== Awards and recognitions ==
In 2016, Hickey received an honorary doctorate degree from Siena College.

== Personal life ==
Hickey and his wife, Dawn Ross, have been prominent financial supporters of Democratic presidential candidates, including John Kerry, Barack Obama, Hillary Clinton, and Joe Biden. They have two sons.

Diplomatic posts
Preceded by Robert Pence	United States Ambassador to Finland; 2022–2024	Succeeded by Vacant
