= Techtronic Industries =

Manufacturer of major power tool brands

Techtronic Industries Company Limited
- Native name: 創科實業有限公司
- Type: Public
- Traded as: SEHK: 669; OTCQX: TTNDY; OTCQX: TTNDF
- Industry: Manufacturing
- Founded: 24 May 1985; 41 years ago
- Founders: Horst Julius Pudwill; Roy Chung Chi Ping
- Headquarters: Hong Kong
- Area served: Worldwide
- Key people: Horst Julius Pudwill (chairman); Stephan Horst Pudwill (vice chairman); Steven Richman (CEO and group executive director); Frank Chan (group CFO and group executive director)
- Products: Power tools; Accessories; Hand tools Outdoor power equipment Floorcare and cleaning
- Revenue: US$15.3 billion (2025)
- Number of employees: 48,318 (December 2025)
- Website: www.ttigroup.com

Techtronic Industries Company Limited (TTI Group or TTI) is a Hong Kong–based multinational company that designs, produces, and markets cordless power tools, outdoor power equipment, hand tools, and floor care appliances.

TTI's products are manufactured in China, Vietnam, the United States, Mexico, and Europe, and in 2025, had annual sales of US$15.3 billion.

== History ==
In 1985, TTI was founded by Horst Julius Pudwill and Roy Chi Ping Chung as an original equipment manufacturer for overseas brands. In 1987, it began to produce Craftsman cordless power tools for Sears followed by cordless, handheld vacuum cleaners for Bissell.

In 1990, TTI listed on the Hong Kong Stock Exchange under stock code 0669 by initial public offering. Its ADRs also trade on Nasdaq as TTNDY. In 2019, the company's shares became one of the 50 constituents of the Hang Seng Index.

TTI acquired Ryobi Limited's North American power tools business in August 2000. In August 2001 TTI acquired European Ryobi power tools business and in March 2002 TTI acquired two subsidiaries of Ryobi Limited, Ryobi Australia Pty Limited and Ryobi New Zealand Limited.

Techtronic purchased Milwaukee Electric Tool from Atlas Copco in 2005 and began integrating lithium-ion batteries into their lineup.

== Brands ==
=== Power tools ===
- AEG Electric Tools under license from Electrolux AB)
- Empire Level
- Hart Tools
- Homelite
- Imperial Blades
- Kango (Australia & New Zealand)
- Milwaukee Tool
- Ryobi power tools in North America, Europe, Australia, and New Zealand, under license from Ryobi)
- Stiletto
- DreBo DreBo Werkzeugfabrik GmbH still exists today as an independent company not connected to TTI Group
- Most Ridgid branded tools

=== Floorcare & cleaning ===
- Hoover (In US and Canada)
- Oreck
- Vax (In UK and Australia)
- Dirt Devil

== Awards ==
- Forbes World’s Best 200 Small Companies, 2002
- Hong Kong Awards for Industries Consumer Product Design, 2008 and 2012
- Euromoney Best Managed Company in Asia - Consumer Goods, 2014
- The Home Depot Environmental Partner of the Year and Interconnected Partner of the Year, 2020
