= Maxwell M. Hamilton =

American diplomat

United States Ambassador to Finland
- In office September 25, 1945 – March 26, 1946
- Preceded by: Benjamin M. Hulley (interim)
- Succeeded by: Avra M. Warren

Personal details
- Born: 1896
- Died: 1957 (aged 60–61)
- Education: Washington & Jefferson College

Maxwell McGaughey Hamilton (1896–1957) was an American diplomat and United States Ambassador to Finland between 1945 and 1947.

He graduated from Washington and Jefferson College, where he was a member of Phi Delta Theta, in 1918.

Hamilton was in the State Department's Division of Far East Affairs under Stanley Hornbeck.

On December 8, 1944, Maxwell was appointed U.S. Representative to Finland, an appointment coming shortly after the end of World War II that did not constitute formal resumption of relations with Finland. Following the 1945 parliamentary election, the United States agreed to resume full relations with Finland. He was appointed Envoy Extraordinary and Minister Plenipotentiary to Finland on September 25, 1945 and he presented his credentials on March 26, 1946. His mission was terminated on August 25, 1947.
