= Robert Pence =

American businessman and diplomat (born 1945)

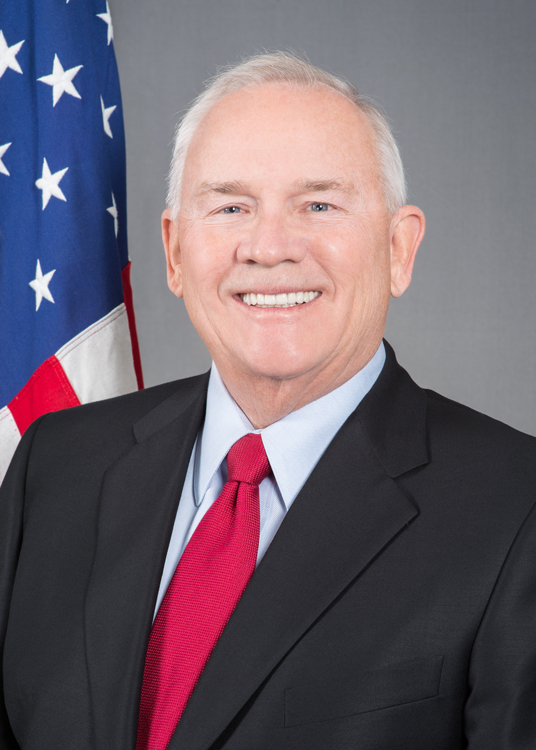
- Official portrait, 2018

34th United States Ambassador to Finland
- In office May 24, 2018 – January 14, 2021
- President: Donald Trump
- Preceded by: Charles C. Adams Jr.
- Succeeded by: Doug Hickey

Personal details
- Born: Robert Frank Pence; 1945 (age 80–81) Washington, D.C., U.S.
- Party: Republican
- Spouse: Susan Sarbacher (m. 1968)
- Children: 3
- Education: University of Maryland (BA); American University (JD, MA); Yale University (MPhil, MA)

Robert Frank Pence (born 1945) is an American businessman who was United States Ambassador to Finland. His nomination was confirmed by the Senate on March 22, 2018.

A graduate of the Washington College of Law at American University, he is the namesake of the school's Pence Law Library.

== Early life and family ==
=== Childhood and education ===
Pence was born in Washington, D.C. in 1945. He attended the University of Maryland in College Park, earning a Bachelor of Arts in English; the American University, earning a Juris Doctor from the Washington College of Law and Master of Arts degrees in Renaissance art and literature; and Yale University, earning a Master of Arts and Master of Philosophy, both in Italian.

=== Marriage ===
Pence married Susan "Suzy" Sarbacher in 1968. Together, they had three sons.

== Career ==
Pence founded The Pence Group (formerly known as Pence-Friedel Developers, Inc.), a commercial development firm, in 1984 and served as its president for more than thirty years. A Republican Party donor, he did not support the candidacy of Donald Trump but was recommended for an ambassadorial appointment by Vice President-elect Mike Pence, to whom he is not related. He served as ambassador until January 14, 2021.

=== Rescinding award from Jessikka Aro ===
In 2019, the State Department selected Finnish journalist Jessikka Aro as a recipient of the prestigious International Women of Courage Award and notified her that she would be receiving the award. But the award was withdrawn after Ambassador Pence and others expressed concerns that Aro had authored social media posts that were critical of President Donald Trump and might make an anti-Trump political statement during the award ceremony.

The Office of the Inspector General at the State Department investigated the decision to withdraw the report and concluded that Department officials, including Ambassador Pence, lied to Congress and the public about its reasons for rescinding the report.

Diplomatic posts
Preceded by Charles C. Adams Jr.	United States Ambassador to Finland; 2018–2021	Succeeded by Doug Hickey
