= List of ambassadors of the United States to Finland =

Ambassador of the United States to Finland
- Seal of the United States Department of State

- Flag of a United States ambassador

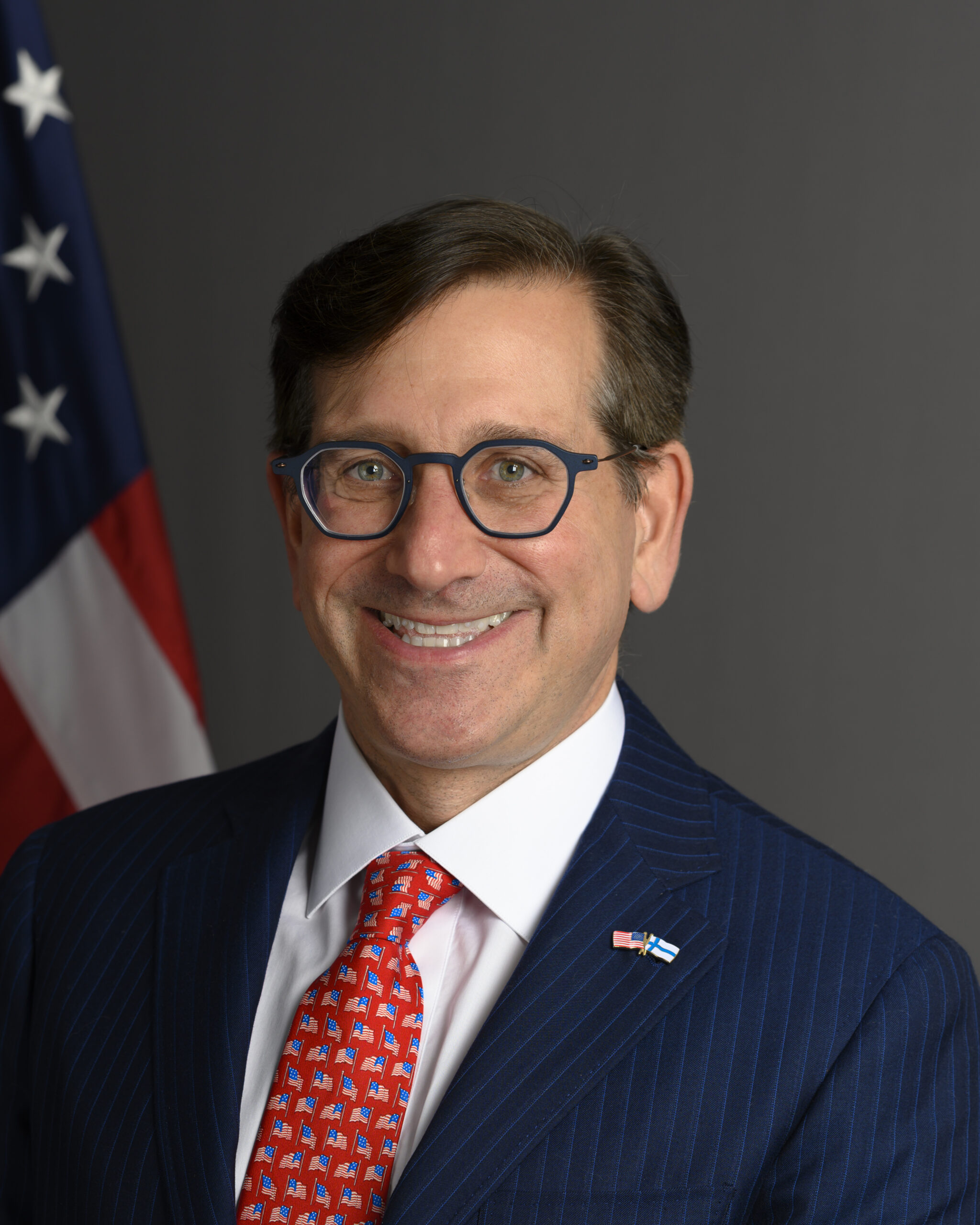
- Incumbent; Howard Brodie since November 13, 2025
- Nominator: The president of the United States
- Appointer: The president; with Senate advice and consent
- Inaugural holder: Alexander R. Magruder as Chargé d'Affaires
- Formation: March 19, 1920; 106 years ago
- Website: fi.usembassy.gov

The ambassador of the United States to Finland is the highest-ranking diplomatic position of the United States in Finland. The U.S. ambassadors are nominated by the president to serve as the country's diplomatic representatives to Finland. Under Article II, Section 2 of the U.S. Constitution, their appointment must be confirmed by the United States Senate; while an ambassador may be appointed during a recess, they can serve only until the end of the next session of Congress, unless subsequently confirmed. Ambassadors are under the jurisdiction of the Department of State and answer directly to the secretary of state; however, ambassadors serve "at the pleasure of the President", meaning they can be dismissed at any time. Appointments change regularly for various reasons, such as reassignment or retirement. An ambassador may be a career Foreign Service Officer (career diplomat – CD) or a political appointee (PA). In most cases, career foreign service officers serve a tour of approximately three years per ambassadorship, whereas political appointees customarily tender their resignations upon the inauguration of a new American president. The U.S. ambassador to Finland resides in Helsinki, the country's capital and location of the U.S. Embassy.

Finland declared its independence on December 6, 1917 after being a part of the Russian Empire since 1809. The first country to recognize Finland was the Russian SFSR on January 4th, 1918.

The United States recognized Finland as an independent state on May 7, 1919. A U.S. legation was established in Helsinki and the first envoy, Alexander R. Magruder, presented his credentials as Chargé d'Affaires to the government of Finland on March 19, 1920. United States–Finland relations have been continuous since that time except for a brief period in 1944–45 when the U.S. severed relations during World War II.

The U.S. Embassy in Finland is located in Helsinki in the Kaivopuisto neighborhood.

== Ambassadors ==
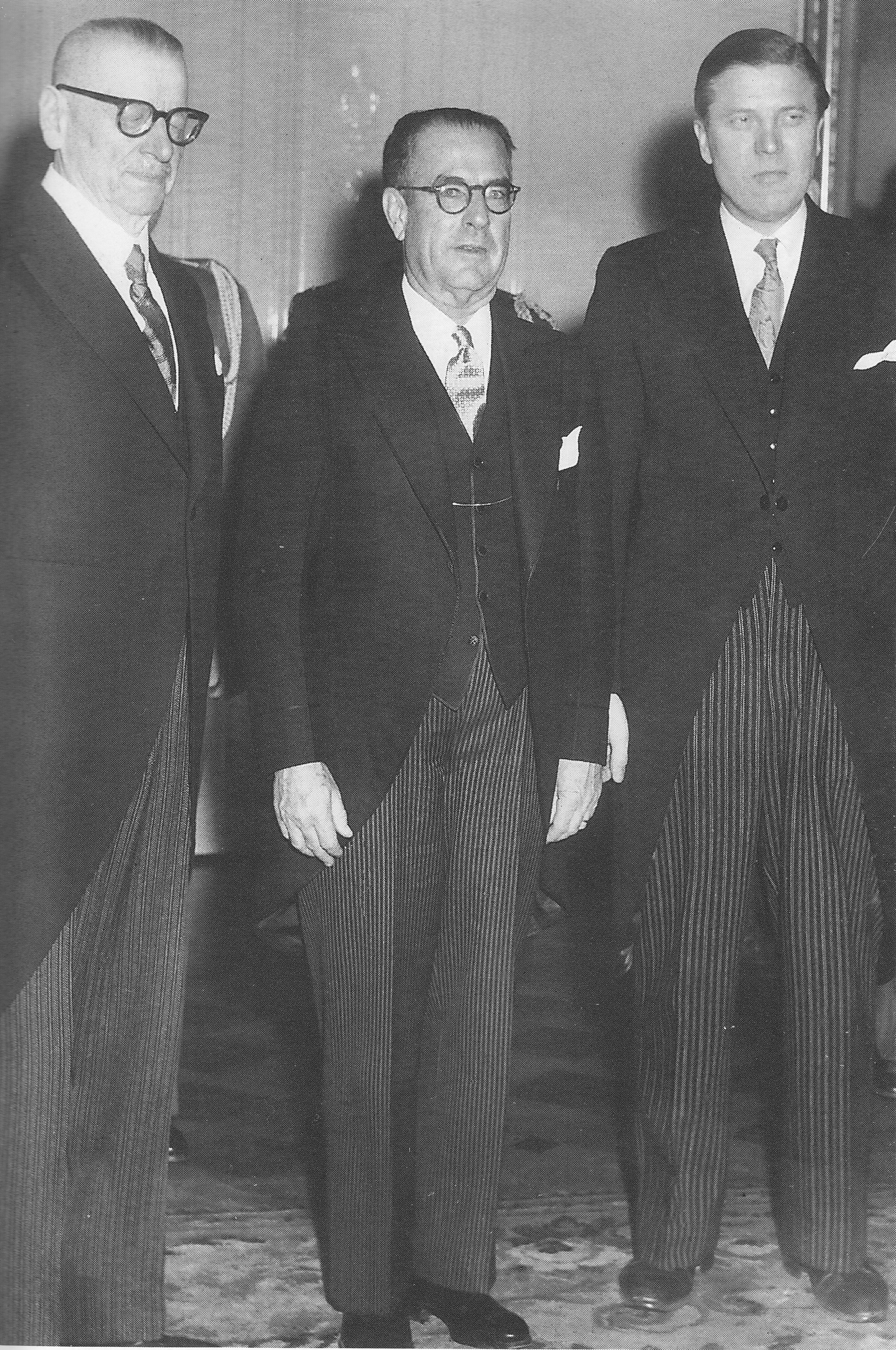
Ambassador John D. Hickerson with president Juho Kusti Paasikivi (left) and foreign minister Johannes Virolainen (right) in 1955

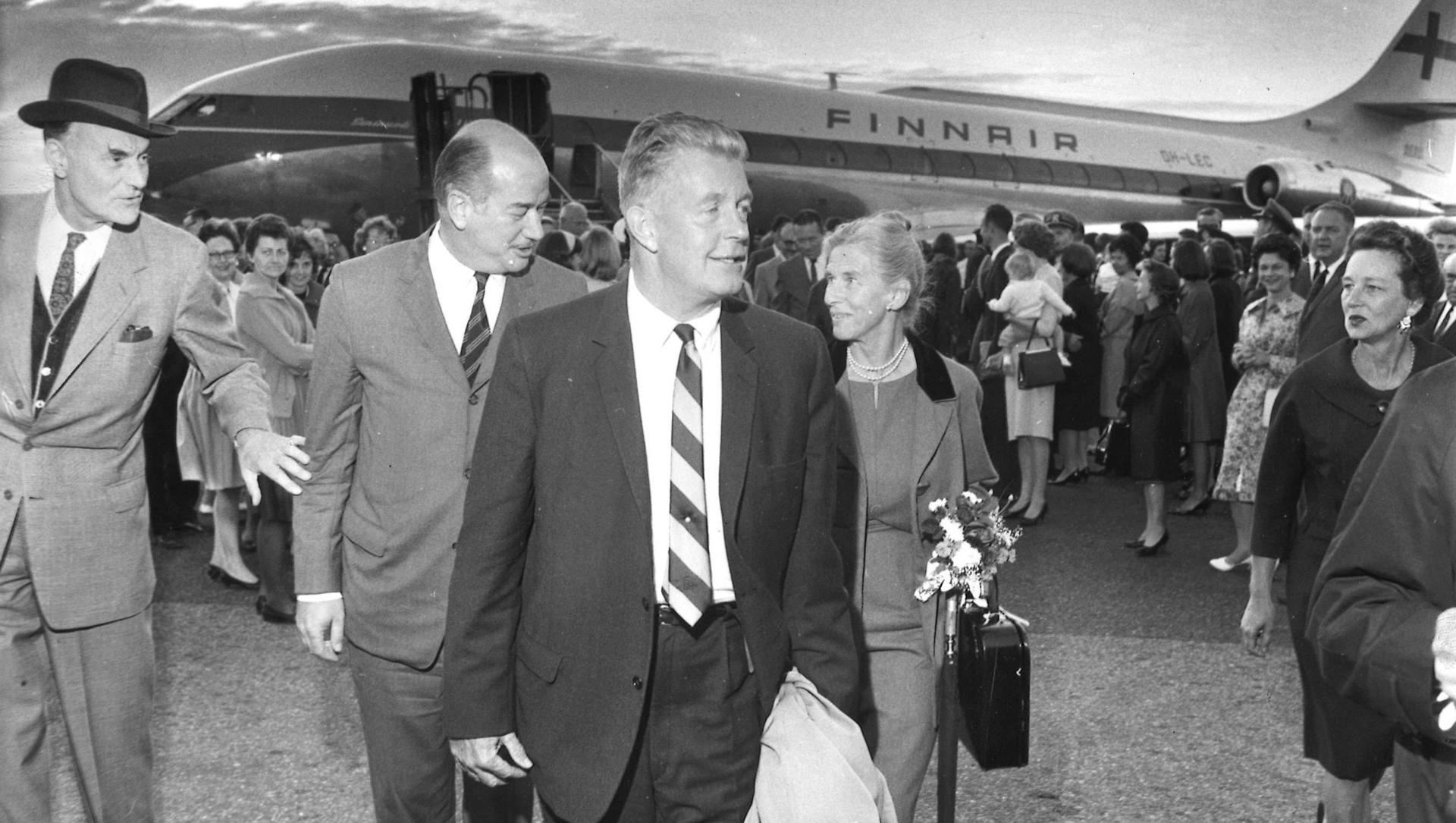
Tyler Thompson arrives in Finland in August 1964

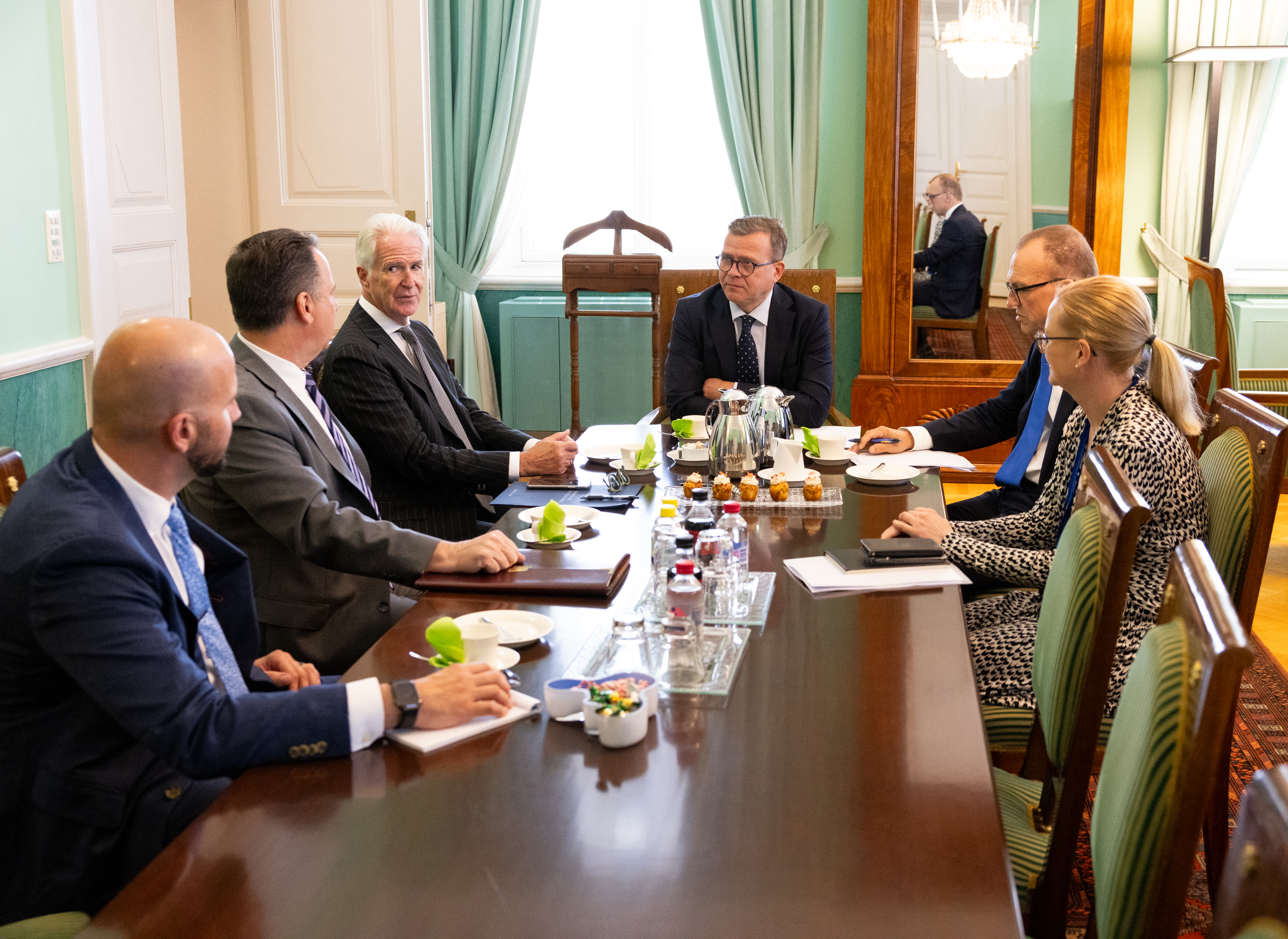
Douglas Hickey, United States Ambassador to Finland visits Prime Minister of Finland Petteri Orpo in 2023

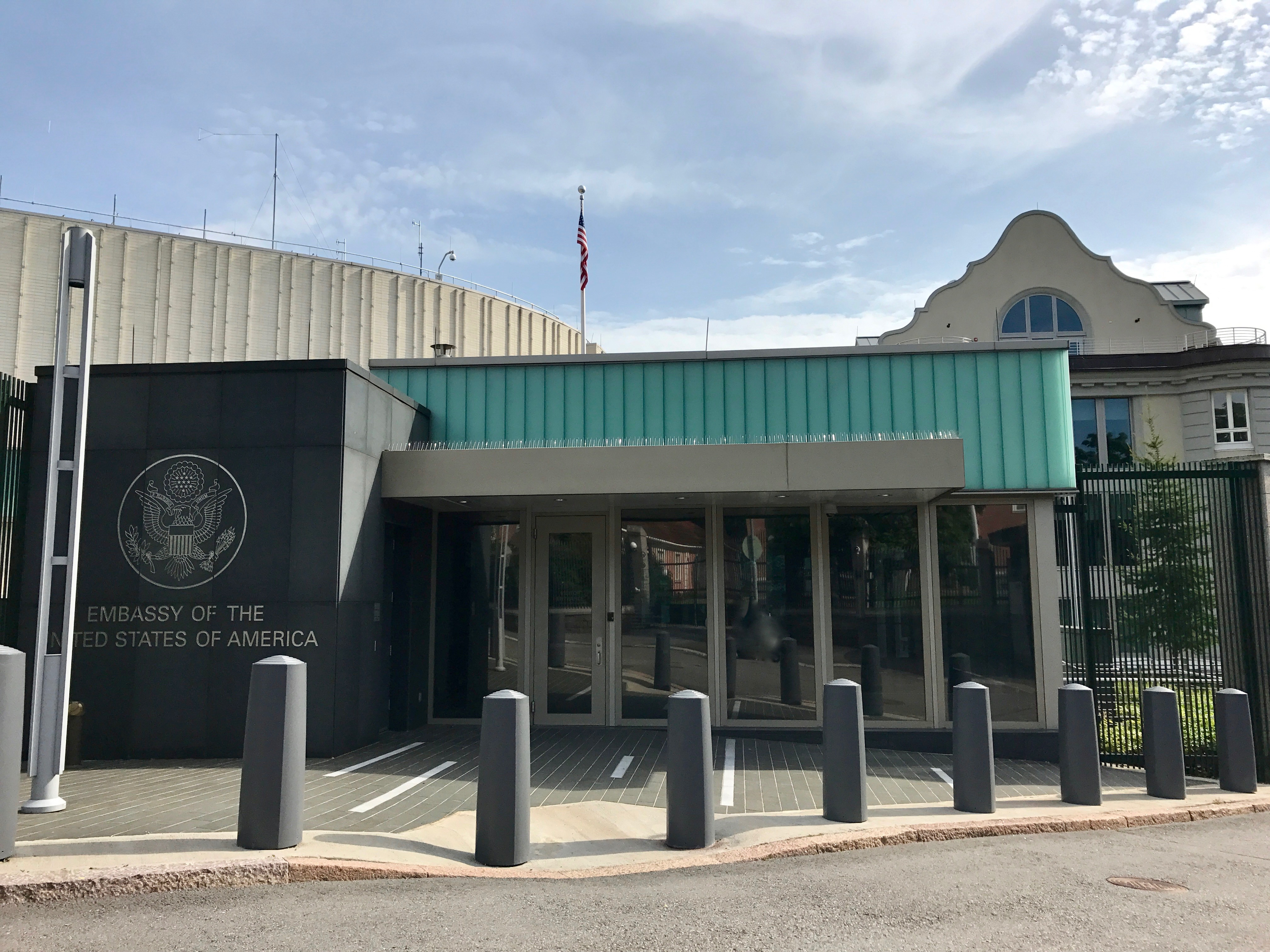
Embassy of the United States in Kaivopuisto, Helsinki in 2017

Image	Name	Title	Appointed	Presented credentials	Terminated mission	Notes
	Alexander R. Magruder – Career FSO	Chargé d'Affaires	March 19, 1920		February 17, 1922	
	Charles L. Kagey – Political appointee	Envoy Extraordinary and Minister Plenipotentiary	October 8, 1921	February 17, 1922	March 24, 1925	
	Alfred J. Pearson – Political appointee	Envoy Extraordinary and Minister Plenipotentiary	June 23, 1925	September 5, 1925	April 30, 1930	
	Edward E. Brodie – Political appointee	Envoy Extraordinary and Minister Plenipotentiary	January 31, 1930	May 16, 1930	September 21, 1933	
	Edward Albright – Political appointee	Envoy Extraordinary and Minister Plenipotentiary	July 21, 1933	October 5, 1933	April 12, 1937	
	H. F. Arthur Schoenfeld – Career FSO	Envoy Extraordinary and Minister Plenipotentiary	April 22, 1937	July 2, 1937	December 17, 1942	
The United States severed diplomatic relations with Finland on June 30, 1944, as result of the Continuation War. Edmund A. Gullion was serving as Chargé d'Affaires ad interim when the relations were severed. The United States reestablished diplomatic relations with Finland after World War II. The legation in Helsinki was reestablished September 1, 1945, with Benjamin M. Hulley as Chargé d'Affaires ad interim.
	Maxwell M. Hamilton – Career FSO	Envoy Extraordinary and Minister Plenipotentiary	September 25, 1945	March 26, 1946	August 25, 1947	
	Avra M. Warren – Career FSO	Envoy Extraordinary and Minister Plenipotentiary	December 18, 1947	February 10, 1948	February 18, 1950	
	John M. Cabot – Career FSO	Envoy Extraordinary and Minister Plenipotentiary	February 2, 1950	February 27, 1950	September 20, 1952	
	Jack K. McFall – Career FSO	Envoy Extraordinary and Minister Plenipotentiary	September 10, 1952	November 15, 1952	September 19, 1955	The legation in Helsinki was raised to embassy status on September 10, 1954. Concurrently the post of Minister became that of Ambassador Extraordinary and Plenipotentiary.
	John D. Hickerson – Career FSO	Ambassador Extraordinary and Plenipotentiary	October 4, 1955	November 23, 1955	November 3, 1959	
	Edson O. Sessions – Political appointee	Ambassador Extraordinary and Plenipotentiary	October 20, 1959	November 28, 1959	November 20, 1960	
	Bernard Gufler – Career FSO	Ambassador Extraordinary and Plenipotentiary	February 24, 1961	April 14, 1961	April 18, 1963	
	Carl T. Rowan – Political appointee	Ambassador Extraordinary and Plenipotentiary	March 9, 1963	May 21, 1963	February 8, 1964	
	Tyler Thompson – Career FSO	Ambassador Extraordinary and Plenipotentiary	July 31, 1964	August 25, 1964	June 14, 1969	
	Val Peterson – Political appointee	Ambassador Extraordinary and Plenipotentiary	May 1, 1969	July 14, 1969	March 23, 1973	
	V. John Krehbiel – Political appointee	Ambassador Extraordinary and Plenipotentiary	March 27, 1973	June 1, 1973	February 24, 1975	
	Mark Evans Austad – Political appointee	Ambassador Extraordinary and Plenipotentiary	February 20, 1975	March 20, 1975	April 14, 1977	
	Rozanne L. Ridgway – Career FSO	Ambassador Extraordinary and Plenipotentiary	May 26, 1977	August 5, 1977	February 20, 1980	
	James E. Goodby – Career FSO	Ambassador Extraordinary and Plenipotentiary	March 18, 1980	April 11, 1980	August 18, 1981	
	Keith Foote Nyborg – Political appointee	Ambassador Extraordinary and Plenipotentiary	July 30, 1981	September 18, 1981	February 17, 1986	
	Rockwell A. Schnabel – Political appointee	Ambassador Extraordinary and Plenipotentiary	December 17, 1985	February 28, 1986	February 24, 1989	
	John Giffen Weinmann – Political appointee	Ambassador Extraordinary and Plenipotentiary	October 10, 1989	November 10, 1989	August 29, 1991	
	John Hubert Kelly – Career FSO	Ambassador Extraordinary and Plenipotentiary	December 2, 1991	December 20, 1991	July 5, 1994	
	Derek Shearer – Political appointee	Ambassador Extraordinary and Plenipotentiary	May 29, 1994	July 1, 1994	October 31, 1997	
	Eric S. Edelman – Career FSO	Ambassador Extraordinary and Plenipotentiary	June 29, 1998	August 27, 1998	January 29, 2001	
	Bonnie McElveen-Hunter – Political appointee	Ambassador Extraordinary and Plenipotentiary	November 5, 2001	December 5, 2001	December 15, 2003	
	Earle I. Mack – Political appointee	Ambassador Extraordinary and Plenipotentiary	May 25, 2004	June 10, 2004	October 20, 2005	
	Marilyn Ware – Political appointee	Ambassador Extraordinary and Plenipotentiary	February 7, 2006	March 9, 2006	March 28, 2008	
	Barbara Barrett – Political appointee	Ambassador Extraordinary and Plenipotentiary	April 20, 2008	May 23, 2008	January 16, 2009	
	Michael Butler	Chargé d'Affaires	January 16, 2009	N/A	August 12, 2009	
	Bruce J. Oreck – Political appointee	Ambassador Extraordinary and Plenipotentiary	August 12, 2009	September 10, 2009	July 25, 2015	
	Charles C. Adams Jr. – Political appointee	Ambassador Extraordinary and Plenipotentiary	June 24, 2015	August 4, 2015	January 20, 2017	
	Robert Pence – Political appointee	Ambassador Extraordinary and Plenipotentiary	March 22, 2018	May 24, 2018	January 14, 2021	
	Ian Campbell	Chargé d'Affaires	January 14, 2021	N/A	May 11, 2022	
	Doug Hickey – Political appointee	Ambassador Extraordinary and Plenipotentiary	March 24, 2022	May 11, 2022	September 20, 2024	
	Christopher Krafft	Chargé d'Affaires	September 20, 2024	N/A	July 24, 2025	
	J. Chris Karber	Chargé d'Affaires	July 25, 2025	N/A	November 13, 2025	
	Howard Brodie – Political appointee	Ambassador Extraordinary and Plenipotentiary	October 7, 2025	November 13, 2025	Present	

== See also ==
- List of ambassadors of Finland to the United States
- Finland–United States relations
- Foreign relations of Finland
- Ambassadors of the United States
