= Homelite Corporation =

American power equipment manufacturing company

- Company type: Public
- Parent: Techtronic Industries
- Website: www.homelite.com

Homelite Corporation is an American power equipment manufacturer, i.e. (chainsaws, leafs blowers, trimmers), that became notable for being one of the largest post-World War II manufacturers of portable electrical generators and professional and consumer level chainsaws, as well as holding the distinction of producing the world's first one-man operated chainsaw.

== History ==
Beginnings

In 1921, entrepreneur Charles H. Ferguson of Port Chester, New York, invented a lightweight, portable, gasoline-powered electrical generator. His newly founded company, the Home Electric Lighting Company (later abbreviated to Homelite), made it possible for thousands of rural farms and households to enjoy the convenience of electricity, where it would be years before power lines would reach many of these remote areas. In addition, many of Mr. Ferguson's generators played a significant role in the war effort, providing portable electricity on demand for the troops during World War II.

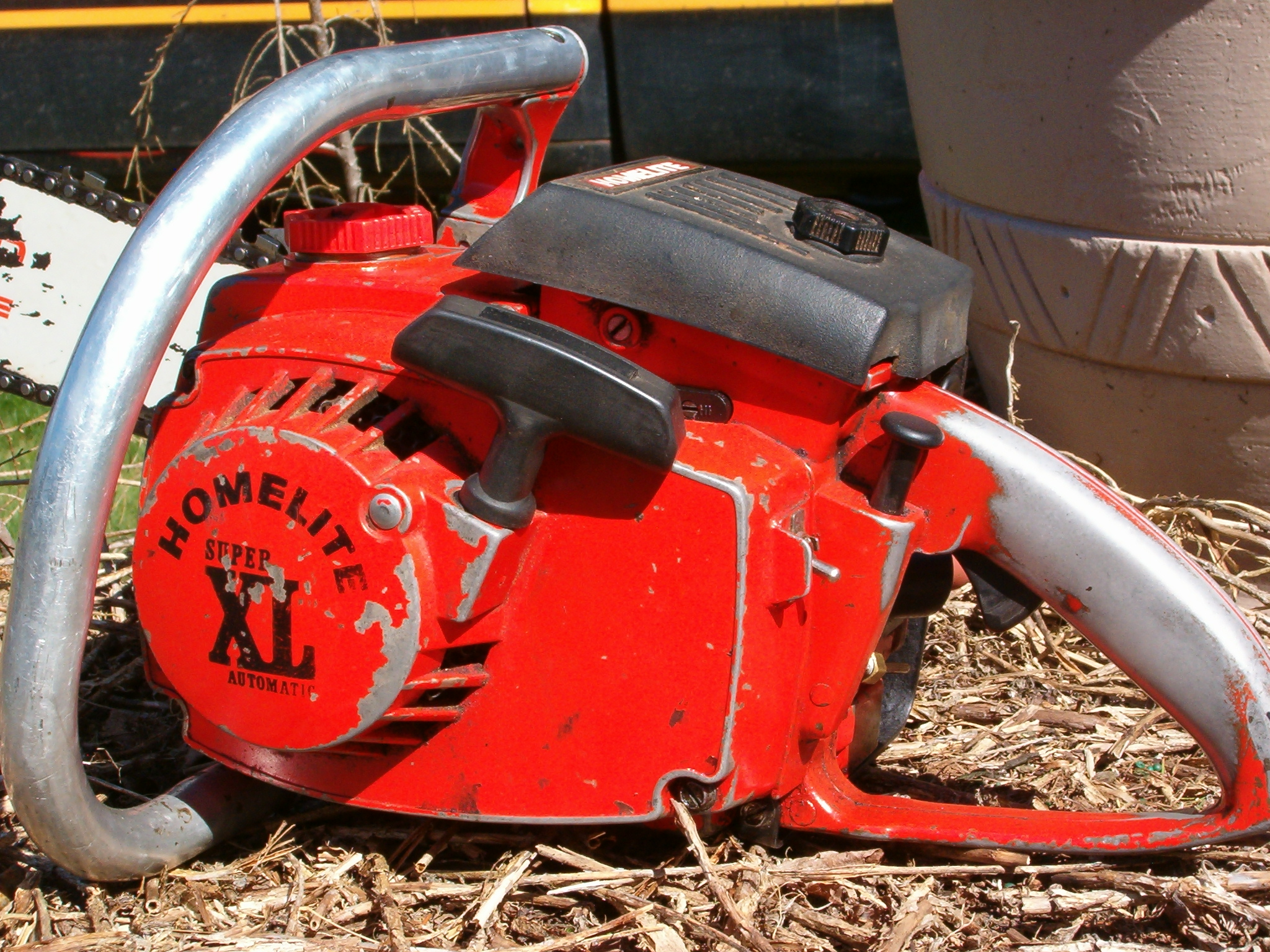
Homelite Super XL Automatic Chainsaw: Upgraded version of XL-12 (has automatic bar/chain oiler).

Chainsaws

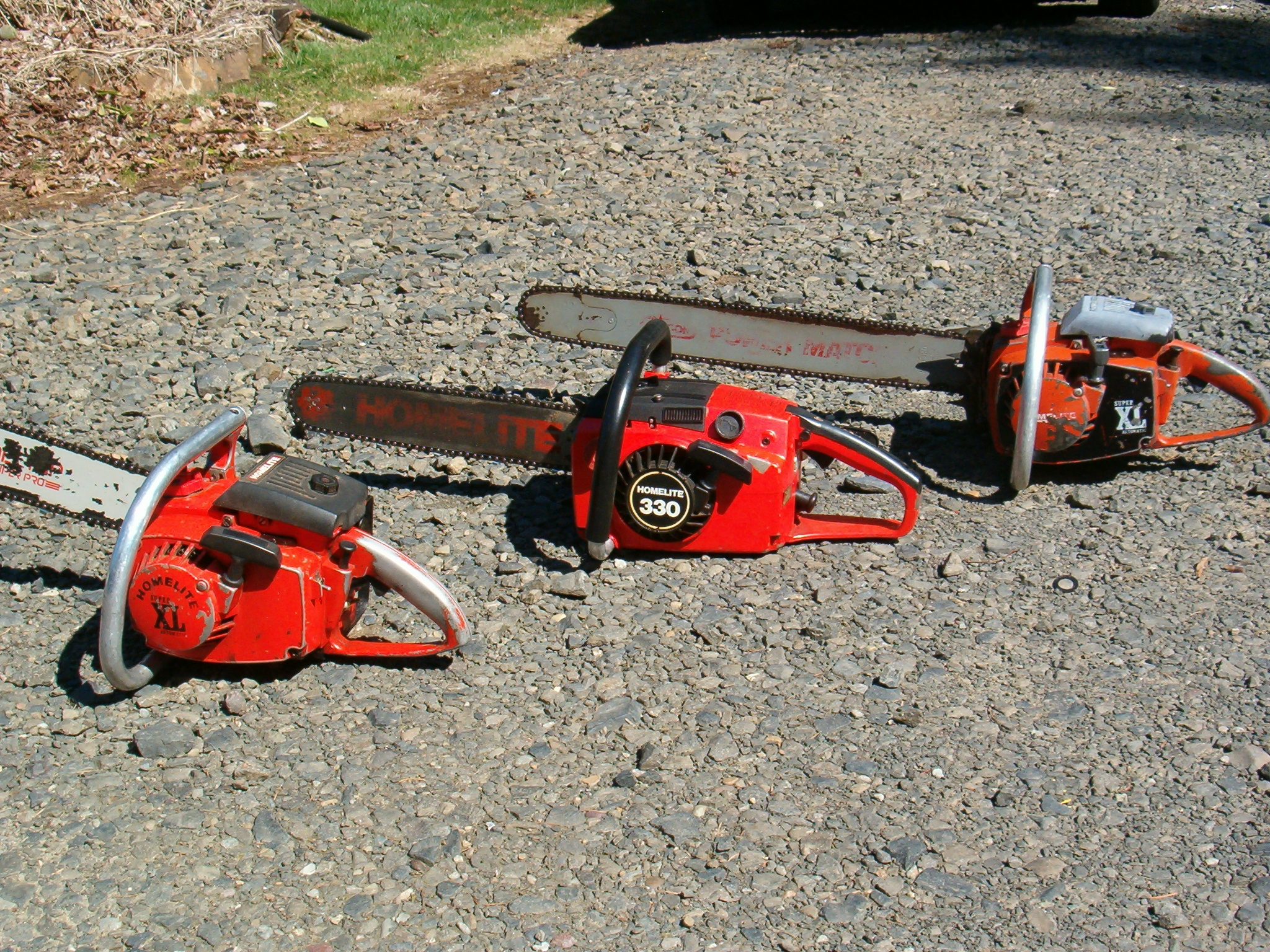
Homelite 330 chainsaw flanked by two Homelite Super XL Automatic Chainsaws

In 1946, Homelite manufactured its first chainsaw, an electrical model, and in 1949, released another power-equipment innovation in the form of the first chainsaw that featured one-man operation (previous saws were generally too large and bulky to be operated by a single individual). By the mid-1960s, Homelite had been firmly established as one of the largest manufacturers of chainsaws in the world, with models ranging from small brush cutters, to the most advanced professional logging saws. The year 1963 saw the introduction of the world's first "lightweight" chainsaw, the magnesium-alloy framed Homelite XL-12; the numeral twelve denoting that the power-head weighed a mere twelve pounds. This saw is widely regarded as one of the most recognizable and well-known chainsaws of all time. In addition, the XL-12 achieved notoriety among horror film aficionados, being used in films like The Evil Dead and its sequels.

Textron acquired Homelite in the 1950s.

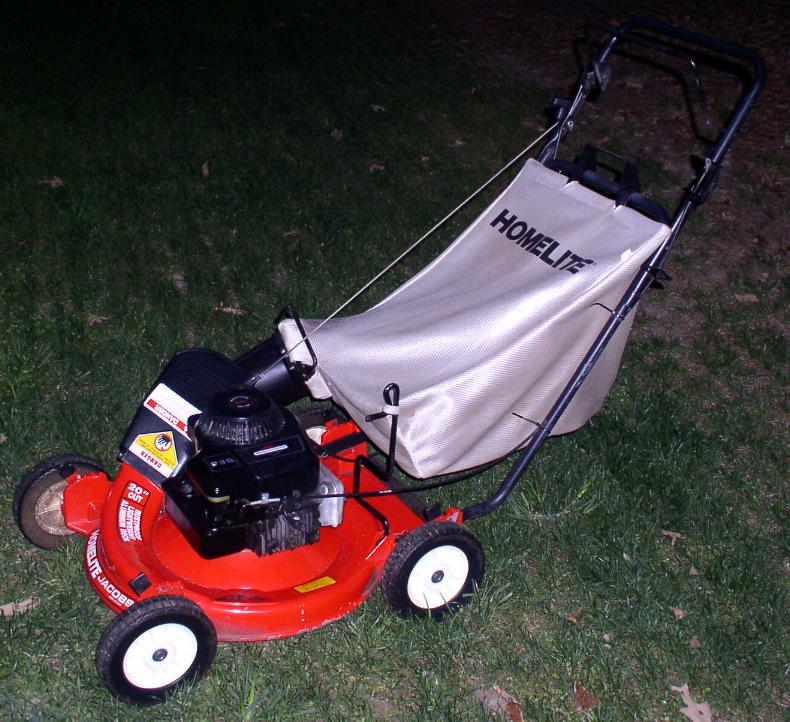

Beginning in the late 1970s, Homelite gradually expanded its power equipment line to include string trimmers, leaf blowers, push mowers, and hedge trimmers. John Deere acquired the brand in 1994.

Techtronic Industries acquired Homelite from John Deere in 2001. Homelite has shifted its production primarily to consumer level lawn and garden equipment and light duty chainsaws. Replacement parts for the older, professional-grade, saws are generally limited to new old stock (NOS) and salvage parts. However, these saws were built to last, and a good percentage of them are still in use to this day. Homelite's parent company is headquartered in Hong Kong.

Homelite XL-12 Chainsaw featured on poster for Texas Chainsaw Massacre - The Next Generation film
