= Tyler Thompson =

American diplomat (1907–2002)

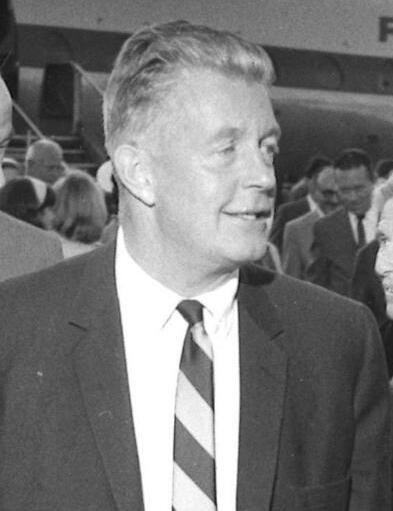
- Thompson in 1964

8th Director General of the Foreign Service
- In office May 14, 1961 – February 15, 1964
- Preceded by: Waldemar J. Gallman
- Succeeded by: Joseph Palmer II

Personal details
- Born: September 21, 1907 Elmira, New York, U.S.
- Died: March 30, 2002 (aged 94) Hancock, Maine, U.S.
- Spouse: Ruth Webb Hunt (m. 1931)
- Children: 2
- Profession: Diplomat

Tyler Thompson (September 21, 1907 – March 30, 2002) was an American Ambassador to Finland and Iceland. He also served as the director general of the Foreign Service.

Thompson was a native of Elmira, New York, where he was born on September 21, 1907. He entered the Foreign Service in 1931 after graduating from Princeton University. He served as the United States ambassador to Iceland January 27, 1960 through April 16, 1961; director general of the Foreign Service from May 14, 1961 through February 15, 1964; special assistant to the Deputy Under Secretary of State for Administration; then as ambassador to Finland July 31, 1964 until June 14, 1969. During the Cold War, he opposed deploying U.S. nuclear weapons in Iceland.

Thompson was married to Ruth Webb Hunt in 1931 and had two children. He died in Hancock, Maine on March 30, 2002.
