= Howard Brodie (diplomat) =

American businessman and diplomat

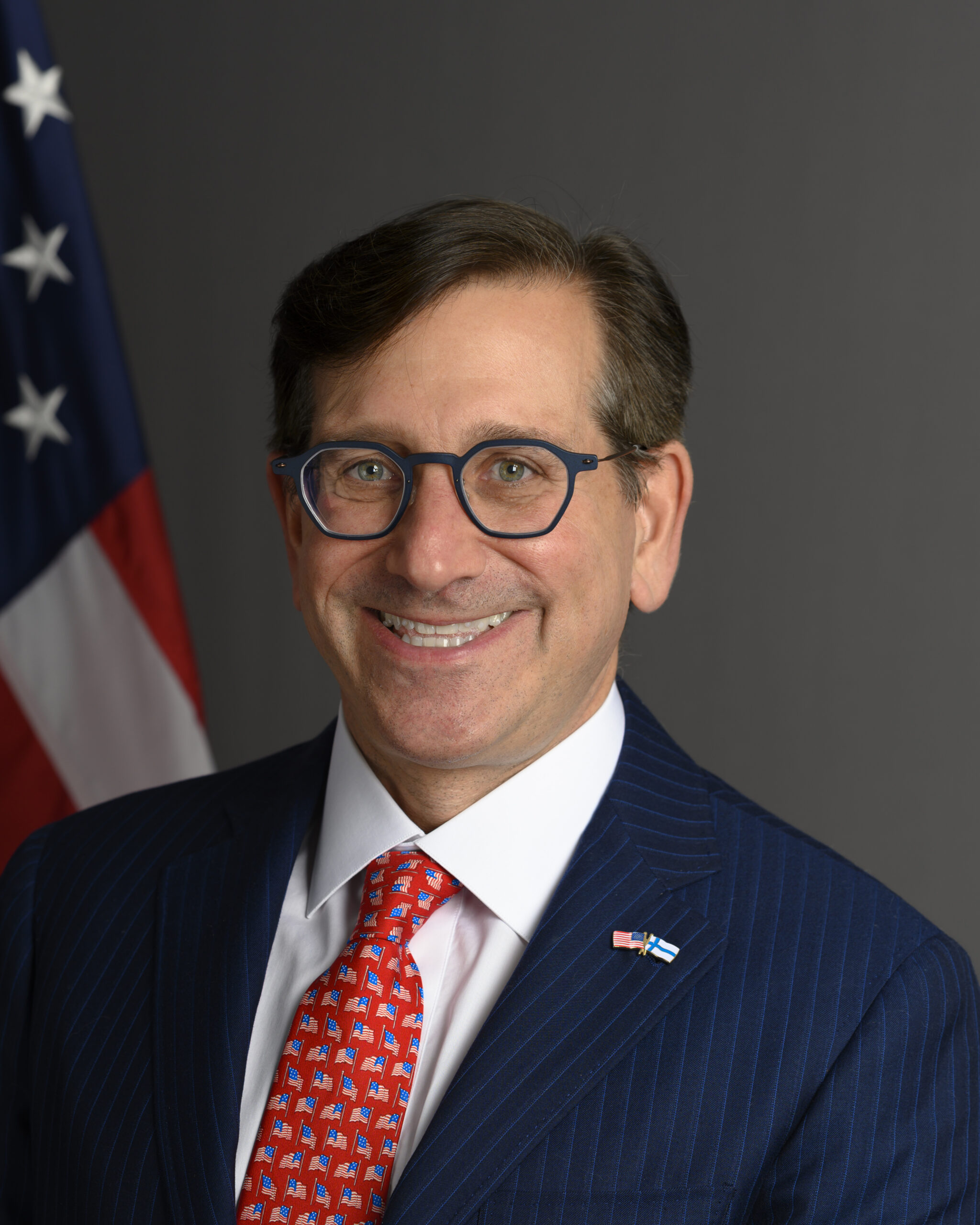
- Official portrait, 2025

United States Ambassador to Finland
- Incumbent
- Assumed office November 13, 2025
- President: Donald Trump
- Preceded by: Doug Hickey

Personal details
- Born: Howard Wexler Brodie Pennsylvania, U.S.
- Party: Republican
- Spouse: Jimena Aparicio Brodie
- Children: 3
- Education: Duke University (BA); Yale Law School (JD)

Howard Brodie is an American businessman, attorney, and diplomat who has served as the United States ambassador to Finland since 2025.

== Early life and education ==
Howard Brodie was born in Pennsylvania to Elizabeth and Stefan Brodie, a billionaire businessman and Republican megadonor who was convicted of conspiring to violate the United States embargo against Cuba in 2002.

Brodie attended Duke University, graduating with a Bachelor of Arts in political science. He attained a Juris Doctor from Yale Law School in 1993, where he was a member of Phi Beta Kappa, going on to study at the University of Oxford. Brodie studied at the University of St. Petersburg from 1990 to 1992 while completing law school at Yale, witnessing the dissolution of the Soviet Union.

== Career ==
After graduating from law school, Brodie clerked for United States circuit judge Gilbert Merritt, and later practiced commercial law, corporate finance, and mergers and acquisitions. He is admitted to practice law in both Pennsylvania and New York.

Brodie served as the head of investment firm Brodie Generational Capital Partners, helping facilitate the US$3.7 billion sale of his father's company, Purolite Corporation, to Ecolab.

=== U.S. ambassador to Finland ===
On February 10, 2025, President Donald Trump nominated Brodie as United States ambassador to Finland. He assumed office on November 13, 2025.

== Personal life ==
Brodie is married to Jimena Aparicio Brodie, an immigrant from Mexico. The couple have a son, born in 2024, and Brodie has two older children from a previous marriage. Prior to assuming the role of ambassador, Brodie and his family split their time between Villanova, Pennsylvania, and Fisher Island, Florida. He is Jewish.

Brodie funded Yale Law School's Howard Wexler Brodie '93 Center for Jewish and Israeli Law, which is named after him. He has donated to his alma mater regularly since 2022, and was a member of the Yale Law School Fund Board.

Diplomatic posts
Preceded by Doug Hickey	United States Ambassador to Finland; 2025–present	Succeeded by
