= Bruce J. Oreck =

American diplomat

Bruce Oreck
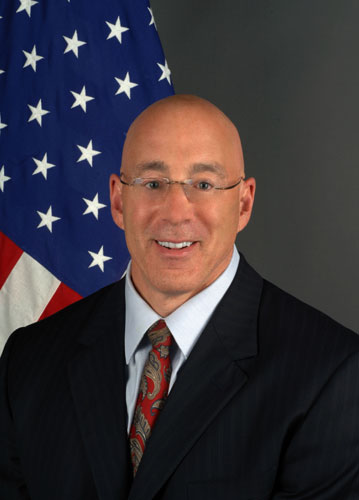
- Official portrait, 2009

United States Ambassador to Finland
- In office September 10, 2009 – July 25, 2015
- President: Barack Obama
- Preceded by: Michael Butler (Acting)
- Succeeded by: Charles Adams

Personal details
- Born: Bruce James Oreck; January 3, 1953 (age 73) New York City, U.S.
- Children: Jessica Oreck
- Parent: David Oreck (father)
- Education: Johns Hopkins University; Louisiana State University, Baton Rouge; New York University

Bruce James Oreck (born January 3, 1953) is a former American politician. He was the U.S. Ambassador to Finland from September 2009 to July 2015.

== Personal life ==
Oreck was born to a Jewish family. His father is David Oreck who founded Oreck Corporation.

== Education ==
He holds a Bachelor of Arts from The Johns Hopkins University, and a Juris Doctor from Louisiana State University, as well as a Master of Laws in Taxation from New York University.

== Career ==
He became a partner in a New Orleans law firm representing the oil and gas industry. In 1992 he founded his own firm, Oreck, Crighton, Adams & Chase.

Oreck has authored several books on taxation. He was one of the major contributors to Barack Obama presidential campaign, 2008.

After his task as an ambassador ended, he decided to stay in Finland and was invited to teach at Aalto University as an executive in residence at the Aalto Ventures Program and Aalto University School of Business 2015-2022. Oreck's subjects were marketing, customer experience, and storytelling.

Currently, he lives in Mexico.

== Reception ==
Idriss J. Aberkane and Eirin B. Haug at E-International Relations cited Oreck as a "vanguard green diplomat" advocating noopolitik and the blue economy:

Here comes green diplomacy, here comes Noopolitik, here comes Oreck's [...] advice of turning a significant piece of the Department of Defense's gargantuan budget into a global investment for peace, prosperity, exemplarity and the Blue Economy rather than for destruction, just as Jimmy Carter had advised.

Diplomatic posts
| Preceded by Michael Butler; Acting | United States Ambassador to Finland; 2009–2015 | Succeeded by Charles Adams |
