= Ryobi =

Tool and industrial parts manufacturer

Ryobi Limited

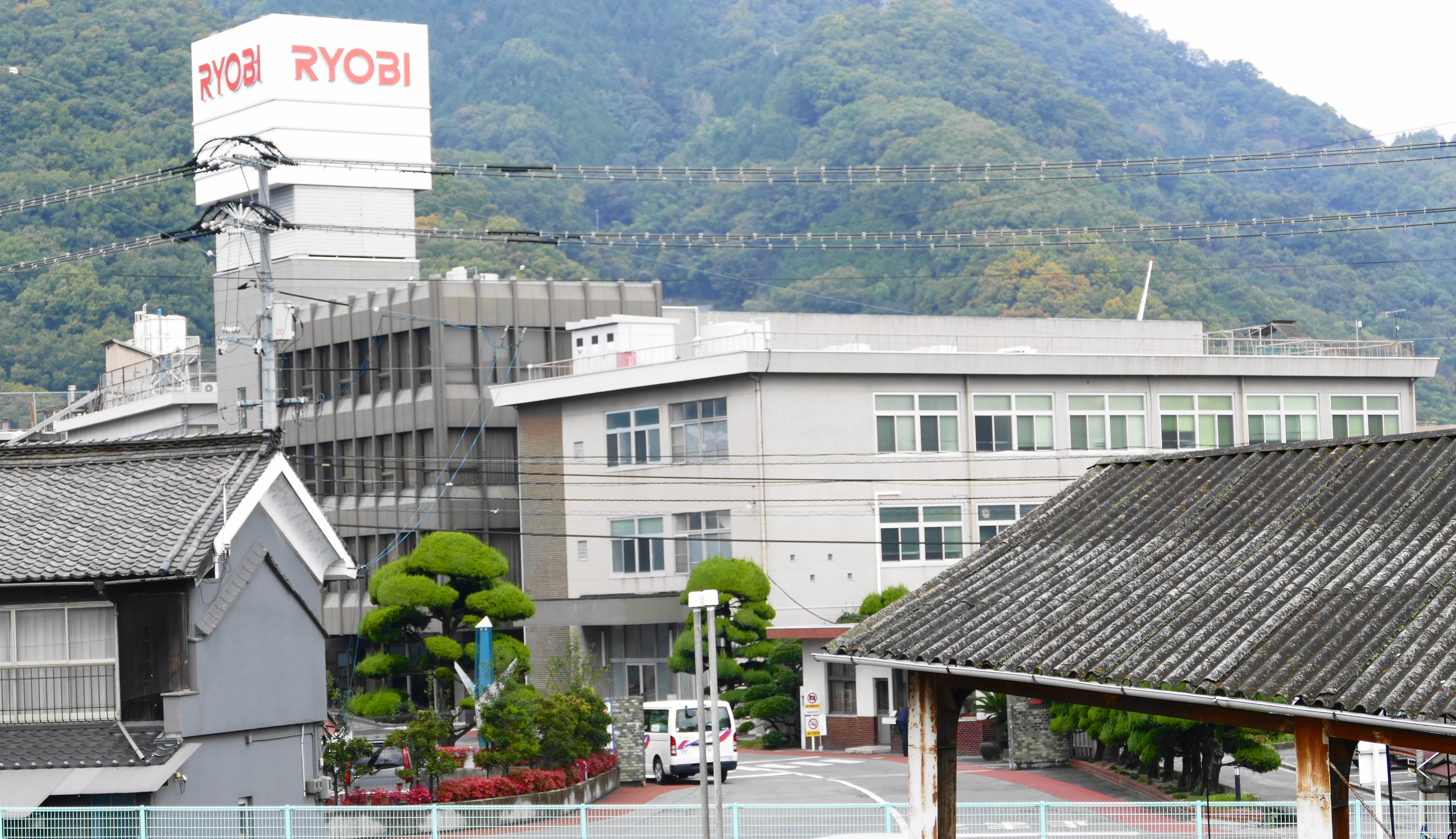
- Company headquarters
- Native name: リョービ株式会社
- Type: Public KK
- Traded as: TYO: 5851; NYSE: RYO
- ISIN: JP3975800008
- Industry: Machinery
- Founded: December 16, 1943; 82 years ago
- Headquarters: Fuchu, Hiroshima 726-8628, Japan
- Area served: Worldwide
- Key people: Akira Urakami (President)
- Products: Die cast products; Electric power tools; Lawn and garden equipment; Builders' hardware; Printing equipment
- Revenue: ▲JPY 254.5 billion (FY 2015) (US$ 2.25 billion) (FY 2015)
- Net income: ▲JPY 9.3 billion (FY 2015) (US$ 94.6 million) (FY 2015)
- Number of employees: 8,993 (as of March 26, 2016)
- Website: Official website

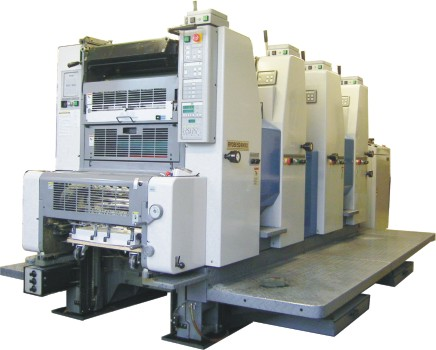
A Ryobi 4 color offset press

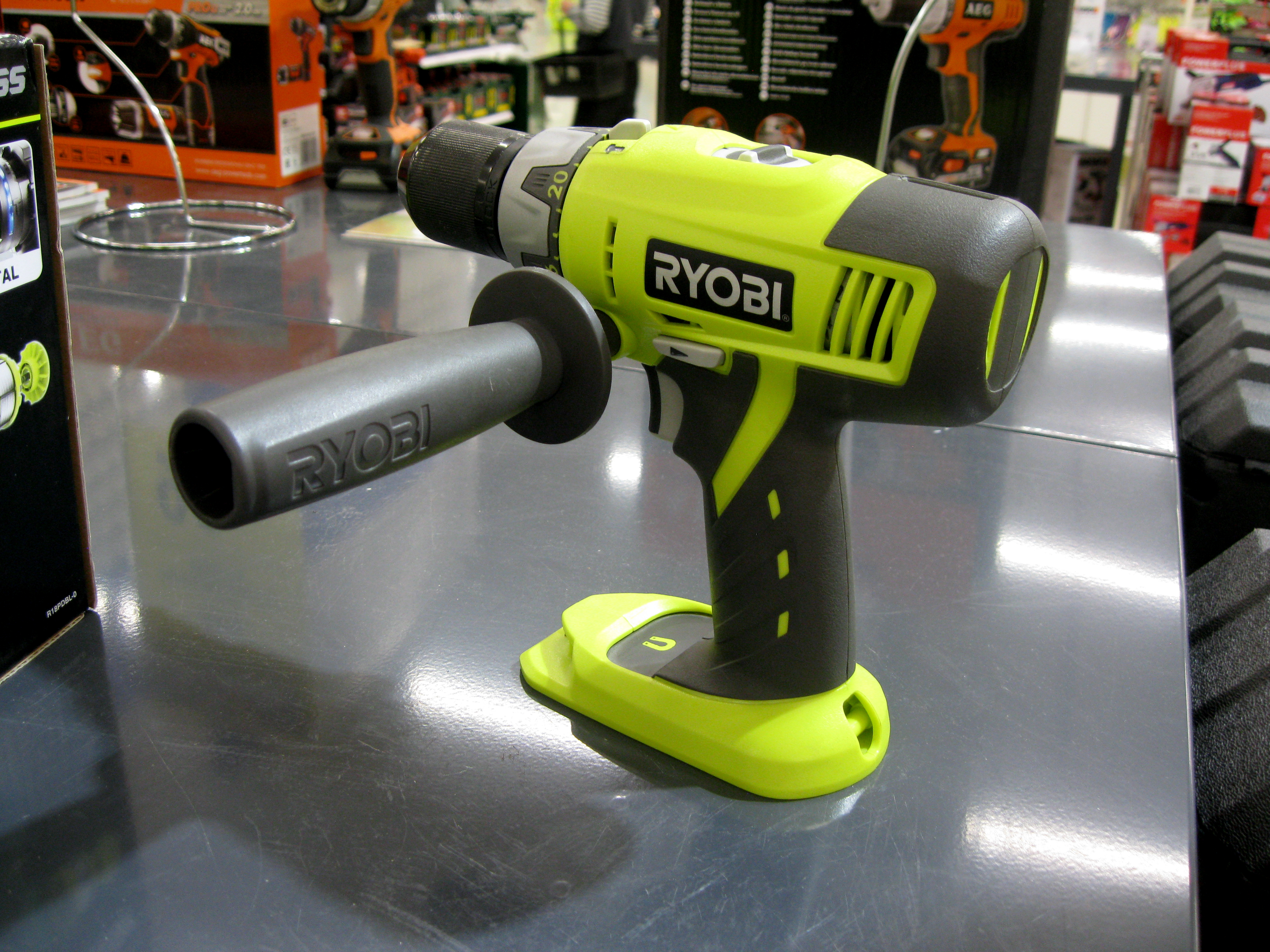
Ryobi power drill

Ryobi Limited ( rye-OH-bee; Japanese: リョービ株式会社, romanized: Ryōbi Kabushiki-gaisha, IPA: [ɾʲoːꜜbi]) is a Japanese manufacturer of components for automobiles, electronics, and telecommunications industries. It also sells printing equipment, power tools, and builders' hardware. Ryobi Power Tools and Ryobi Outdoor Power Equipment are brands of Techtronic Industries, used under license from Ryobi Limited.

== History ==
The Ryobi Seisakusho Co., Ltd., was founded in Japan in 1943 and began selling die-cast products in 1944. In 1961, the company began manufacturing offset printing presses and was listed on the Tokyo Stock Exchange. Ryobi began production of power tools in 1968. The company's name changed in 1973 to Ryobi, Ltd.

Ryobi operates 12 manufacturing facilities across six countries. In 1985, Ryobi launched die casting production in Shelbyville, Indiana, its only manufacturing location in the United States. Ryobi signed an official partnership deal with German football team Hertha Berlin in 2014. In 1991, Ryobi launched production in Carrickfergus, Northern Ireland.

Techtronic Industries (TTI) acquired Ryobi Limited's North American power tools business in August 2000. In August 2001 TTI acquired Ryobi's European power tools business and in March 2002 TTI acquired two subsidiaries of Ryobi Limited, Ryobi Australia Pty. and Ryobi New Zealand Limited.

In 2018, Ryobi transferred the rest of power tools business (Japan, Asia, Latin America, Middle East and Africa markets) to the Kyocera Group.

== U.S. operations ==
Ryobi Die Casting (USA), Inc., is a Shelbyville, Indiana, manufacturer of products for the automobile industry.
