= David Oreck =

American businessman (1923–2023)

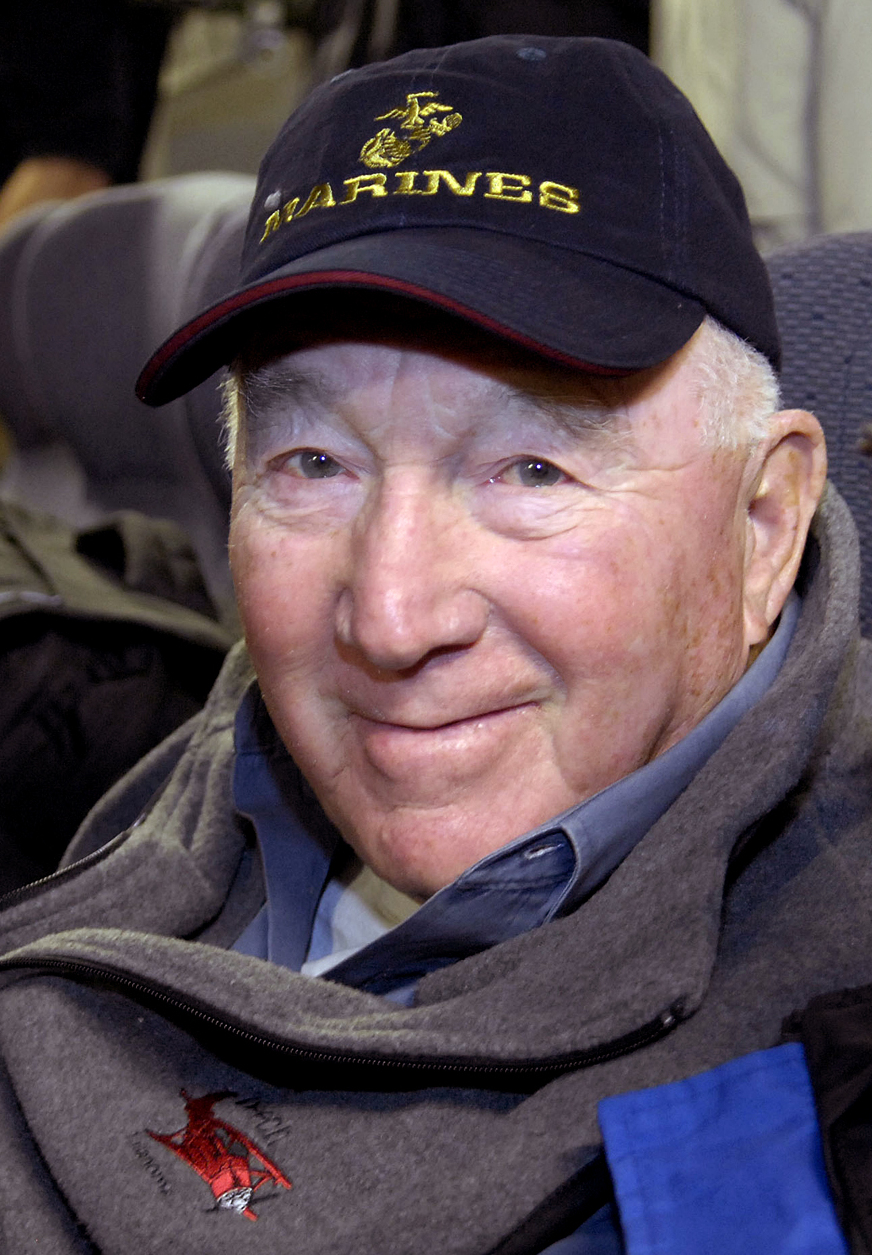
- Oreck in 2008
- Born: David Irving Oreck; September 17, 1923; Duluth, Minnesota, U.S.
- Died: February 15, 2023 (aged 99); Mississippi, U.S.
- Occupations: Businessman, Entrepreneur, Philanthropist
- Spouse: Jan
- Children: 3, including Bruce

David Irving Oreck (September 17, 1923 – February 15, 2023) was an American entrepreneur, business salesman, and speaker. He founded Oreck Corporation, manufacturers of vacuum cleaners and air purifiers, and was known for his appearances in its television commercials.

== Early life ==
Oreck was born on September 17, 1923, in Duluth, Minnesota, to Jewish parents Abraham and Sheba Oreck (née Polinsky). He attended the University of Minnesota Duluth. When he was a child, his father took him on a flight in a Ford Trimotor and, on the ice of Lake Superior, the aircraft landed on skis. The experience proved so exciting to Oreck that he became fascinated with planes, and the mechanics of engines and electronics.

Shortly after Pearl Harbor was attacked, Oreck joined the United States Army Air Corps and served as pilot, navigator, and bombardier in the Pacific Theater for over two years. He participated in bombing missions over Japan in B-29s.

== RCA ==
Following World War II, Oreck joined RCA in New York, working there for 17 years and becoming sales manager. He helped to market washing machines, microwave ovens and televisions. Oreck accompanied RCA General Manager David Sarnoff at congressional hearings to develop standards for color television broadcasts.

Whilst employed by RCA, Oreck ran his own aircraft charter service, frequently stepping in as pilot. He established businesses providing shared television aerials for apartment buildings in New York City, and teaching radio and television repair in Spanish by direct mail.

== Oreck Corporation ==
Oreck was asked to take over a failing RCA distributor in New Orleans. It came with the abandoned design for an upright vacuum cleaner by Whirlpool, a business RCA had a shareholding in. However, Whirlpool's largest customer, Sears was concerned the arrangement would compete with them so in 1963, Oreck and his brother Marshall set up Oreck Corporation to independently sell his own vacuum cleaners by mail order. By 1965, the firm was also the exclusive wholesaler for RCA products in Louisiana. His 8 pounds (3.6 kg) appliance was a third the weight of other machines available. Competitors used this to criticize Oreck's vacuum cleaner's effectiveness and durability. Oreck decided to first market to hotels where light weight would be a selling point.

Over 50,000 hotels worldwide adopted the US manufactured vacuum cleaner, that was light enough to carry between floors, and domestic customers went on to purchase them, often through the floor care stores Oreck established across the country.

Oreck explained, he had "a good idea, a lot of energy, and no money" but "it took 20 years of hard work to begin to succeed".

The Oreck family sold their vacuum cleaner business to private equity investors in 2003, initially American Securities Capital Partners. Ten years later, following Chapter 11 bankruptcy it was purchased by Techtronic Industries.

== Later years ==
Oreck remained active in aviation, maintaining and flying his personal collection of aircraft, which included a Stinson Reliant SR 10J, a Waco WMF, an Aviat Husky Amphibian, an American Champion Decathlon, a Beechcraft Staggerwing G-17S, and a Beech T-34A Mentor.

Oreck spoke at universities around the U.S., seeking to inspire young entrepreneurs and businesspeople. He told his audiences "[You can] see I'm no genius. I didn't get started until I was 40. I did it. You can do it. Only in America could this happen."

David Oreck founded Oreck Pure Air Candles in 2009.

== Personal life ==
Oreck had a wife, Jan; three adult children (Steven, Tom, and Bruce) from his previous marriage to Paula Sarnoff (niece of David Sarnoff), and seven grandchildren.

Oreck died of natural causes on February 15, 2023, at his home in Mississippi. He was 99. He was interred at Metairie Cemetery.

== Philanthropy ==
Oreck and his family have donated money and specimens to mineralogical museums and exhibitions including the Denver Museum of Nature and Science; the Colorado School of Mines Geology Museum, and Hillman Hall of Minerals and Gems.

The Jewish Federation of Greater New Orleans have credited Oreck and his family as major contributors to their Jewish community, and New Orleans as a whole.

Oreck made significant contributions to the Isidore Newman School in New Orleans.

== Books ==
- From Dust to Diamonds, 2013. TAG, Amarillo ISBN 978-1934606438
