= Vax (brand) =

UK cleaning appliance company

- Founder: Alan Brazier
- Area served: United Kingdom; Australia

Vax UK Ltd is a British based brand that manufactures electrical goods and cleaning products in the floor-care and air treatment sectors, and which has its headquarters in the United Kingdom. Since 1999 the brand has been owned by a company called TTI Co. Ltd Group, which is based in Hong Kong. Vax UK Ltd has its main headquarters and R&D centre located in the city centre of Birmingham, West Midlands and a service, warehouse and depot operation in the village of Hampton Lovett, near Droitwich, Worcestershire. Vax branded machines are manufactured in China. Vax employs over 400 staff across its Birmingham and Droitwich sites in the UK.

== History ==
Vax UK Ltd was founded in December 1977 by Alan Brazier, who had prior experience in the field of industrial carpet cleaning. Brazier developed a prototype of a machine suitable for a household but capable of washing carpets and handling accident spillages or flooding. In 1979, Vax launched an "orange tub" multi-functional floor-care machine to fulfil this purpose and initially engaged with consumers by door-to-door sales of the device. This product was a world first.

=== Trademark conflict with DEC and advertising slogan ===
Although Digital Equipment Corporation's VAX minicomputer was introduced October 25, 1977 and Vax UK Ltd was formed months later, DEC (for a while) still had a trademark problem.

In 1986-87 and some later advertisements, the company adopted the slogan, "Nothing sucks like a Vax!" This echoed its competitor's slogan from the 1960s, "Nothing sucks like Electrolux". Playing on the double meaning of the word "sucks", the slogan "Nothing sucks like a VAX!" was used by critics of the VAX computer and complex instruction set computers in general.

Vax products were first offered for sale by high-street retailers in 1982, and the 111 Orange Tub model went on to become a top-selling vacuum cleaning product.

=== James Dyson and beyond ===
In June 1990 Vax contracted James Dyson to produce an upright vacuum cleaner aimed at the British market. This deal involved a £75,000 licence. By July 1991, he had left the company to produce this product independently.

In July 2010, Dyson attempted to bring legal action against Vax, over its Mach Zen vacuum cleaner, in the High Court for infringement of design patents. However, in 2011 the UK Court of Appeal rejected this claim.

In 2011, Student Placement Engineer Jake Tyler developed Vax ev, a working prototype of the world's first cardboard vacuum cleaner. This product was featured across a number of tech and environmental online editorials including Gizmag and TreeHugger, and on the BBC Television series Bang Goes the Theory. The cleaner is referenced as a key point in the history of Vacuum Cleaner development by the Best Cordless Vacuum Guide.

In 2014 Vax diversified its product range from vacuums, carpet washers and steam cleaners to include pressure washers, air purifiers and de-humidifiers.
