= Clifton Wharton =

Clifton Wharton may refer to:

- Clifton Reginald Wharton Sr. (1899–1990), American lawyer and ambassador
- Clifton R. Wharton Jr. (1926–2024), deputy Secretary of State in Clinton Administration
