= Sidney Rand =

Sidney Rand may refer to:

- Sidney Rand (rower)
- Sidney Rand (ambassador)
