= V. John Krehbiel =

United States Ambassador to Finland from 1973 to 1975

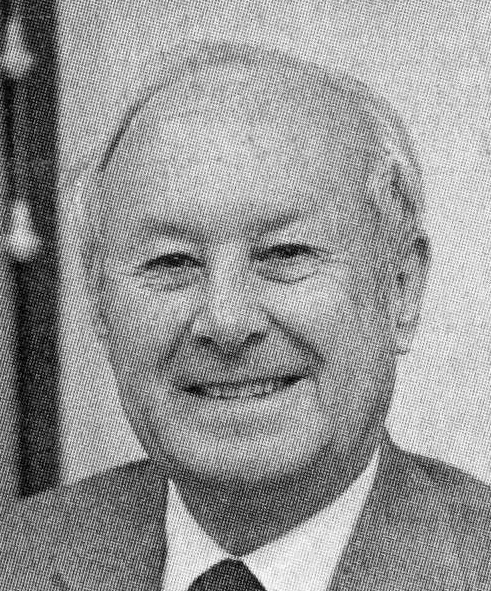
- Krehbiel in 1988

United States Ambassador to Finland
- In office June 1, 1973 – February 24, 1975
- President: Richard Nixon
- Preceded by: Val Peterson
- Succeeded by: Mark Evans Austad

Personal details
- Born: Victor John Krehbiel; 1905 Ogden, Utah, U.S.
- Died: 1997 (aged 91–92) California, U.S.
- Party: Republican

Victor John Krehbiel (1905–1997) was the head of the Republican Party of California, and served as the American ambassador to Finland (1973–1975), a position he was accused of buying with campaign contributions. He was appointed to other political positions by both the Eisenhower and Nixon administrations.

== Early life and education ==
Krehbiel was born on a horse farm near Hutchinson, Kansas. He attended McPherson High School in McPherson, Kansas but graduated from Hutchinson High School (Kansas) in Hutchinson, Kansas. He graduated from the University of Kansas. Krehbiel was married Betty, and the pair moved to Pasadena, California.

== Career ==
In 1943, he joined Aetna Life Insurance, and in 1943 earned the Chartered Life Underwriter, which is the equivalent of a master's degree in insurance. Krehbiel had a long association with President Richard M. Nixon and the Republican party. In 1951 President Dwight D. Eisenhower appointed him to the US trade mission in Germany, and in 1957 to the trade mission to the Scandinavian countries. He was on Nixon's finance committee when he sought reelection to congress in 1948, and as Area Chairman during the 1950 Senatorial campaign. In 1952, 1956, and 1960, he was a delegate to the Republican National Convention, the chairman of LA County's Republican party from 1953 to 1958, the head of the Republican State Committee from 1960 until 1962, when he was succeeded by Caspar Weinberger. In 1955, he succeeded in requiring the adoption of loyalty oaths by state office holders as well as Republican committee members, and continued to assail Democrats for their opposition to loyalty oaths for many years. His term as the head of the California Republican party was controversial for several reasons, including accusations that he was brainwashing other Republican operatives, and he in turn accused Goodwin Knight of attempting blackmail to get Nixon to drop out of the race. He accused California Governor Edmund Brown of having a secret cabinet in 1961. In 1961, he spearheaded a referendum campaign to oppose the California's redistricting. which he characterized as unlawful gerrymandering. In 1962, He was an early backer of Nixon's run for governor, and made headlines with his denunciation of Freedom Riders. In 1968, he discussed ambassadorships with Nixon, expressing an interest in Finland, Luxembourg, and Costa Rica.

At the time of his appointment as ambassador to Finland, Khrebiel was 67 and a senior field underwriter for the Aetna Life and Casualty Company in South Laguna, California. His appointment was characterized as having "followed the custom of rewarding major campaign contributors with ambassadorships." According to preliminary reports from the General Accounting Office, he raised funds for Nixon for at least a decade and contributed at least $30,000 to the President's campaign in 1972. Krehbeil was appointed despite his stated dislike for the Finnish language, which he described as "an impossible language.

In a January 1974 meeting with Vice President Gerald Ford, Krehbeil stated he was working to increase trade between Finland and the United States and discussed issues regarding relationships with the Soviet Union, Finland and the United States.

Krehbiel was unexpectedly replaced by Mark Evans Austad in January 1975, stating he was one of the last to know of his replacement.
