= Lester Corrin Strong =

American diplomat

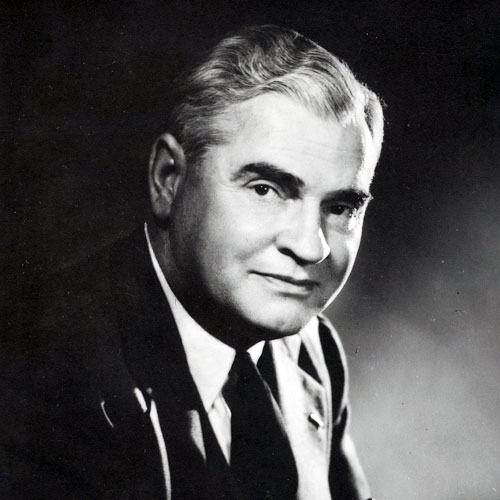

United States Ambassador to Norway
- In office August 10, 1953 – February 16, 1957
- President: Dwight D. Eisenhower
- Preceded by: Charles Ulrick Bay
- Succeeded by: Frances E. Willis

Personal details
- Born: Lester Corrin Lockwood; November 25, 1892 Tacoma, Pierce, Washington, U.S.
- Died: September 20, 1966 (aged 73) Washington, District of Columbia, U.S.
- Spouse: Alice Trowbridge (m. 1922)
- Children: 3

Lester Corrin Strong (1892–1966) was an American diplomat. From 1953 to 1957 he was the United States ambassador to Norway.

== Biography ==
Strong was politically appointed ambassador and was nominated for the embassy mission by President Dwight D. Eisenhower. He presented his credentials on August 10, 1953, to King Haakon VII of Norway, and served until February 16, 1957.

Strong had great interest in visual art. In 1953, the Museum of Modern Art (MoMA) in New York City formed The International Council of The Museum of Modern Art to facilitate exhibitions of American art around the world. In cooperation with MoMA, Strong and his wife hosted a trial exhibition of American art in his residence Villa Otium in Oslo. Several works from MoMA were lent to the residence including Alfonso Roybal’s Green Corn Ceremony, John Kane’s Homestead, Walter Kuhn’s Apples in the Hay, and Stuart Davis’ Summer Landscape.

The trial formed the basis for the Art in the Embassies Program. Strong left his post on February 16, 1957.

After his tenure in Oslo, Strong served as president of the National Cultural Center, a forerunner to the John F. Kennedy Center for the Performing Arts.

A skilled yachtsman, Strong was known in sailing circles around the world, as a founder of the Chesapeake Bay Yacht Racing Association, belonging to the Cruising Club of America and Annapolis, New York and Gibson Island Yacht Clubs, along with the international Royal Swedish and Royal Norwegian Yacht Clubs.

Strong was born in 1892 in Tacoma, Washington to philanthropist Hattie M. Strong. Strong died in 1966.

Diplomatic posts
Preceded by Charles Ulrick Bay	United States Ambassador to Norway; 1953–1957	Succeeded by Frances E. Willis
