= List of ambassadors of the United States to Norway =

Ambassador of the United States to the Kingdom of Norway
- Seal of the United States Department of State

- United States ambassador flag
- Incumbent; Michael E. Kavoukjian since November 5, 2026
- U.S. Department of State; Embassy of the United States, Oslo
- Reports to: U.S. Secretary of State
- Residence: Villa Otium
- Seat: Oslo, Norway
- Nominator: The president of the United States
- Appointer: with the advice and consent of the Senate
- Term length: At the pleasure of the president; No fixed term
- Inaugural holder: Charles H. Graves as Envoy Extraordinary and Minister Plenipotentiary
- Formation: March 8, 1905
- Website: U.S. Embassy - Oslo

The United States ambassador to Norway (formally the ambassador of the United States to the Kingdom of Norway) is the official representative of the president and the government of the United States of America to the king and government of Norway.

Since the United States was recognized as an independent country in 1783, it first established diplomatic relations with Norway in 1818 when Jonathan Russell was accepted as the Minister Plenipotentiary to Sweden and Norway. From 1814 to 1905, Sweden and Norway were in a personal union. Although each country was fully sovereign, they had a common foreign policy and diplomatic service. The United States ambassador to Sweden thus was the U.S. representative to Norway as well as Sweden. In 1905 Sweden and Norway peacefully separated and Norway continued to be an independent constitutional monarchy. On November 14, 1905, the U.S. State Department instructed Ambassador Charles H. Graves to handle affairs for Sweden and Norway separately and the Ambassador was thus commissioned to Norway equally with Sweden, though he remained in Stockholm.

On June 22, 1906, Herbert H. D. Peirce was appointed to be the first ambassador of the U.S. appointed specifically solely for Norway. On August 6, 1906, the embassy in Stockholm ceased all functions related to Norway. Peirce presented his credentials to the foreign minister of Norway on August 13, 1906.

== List of ambassadors ==
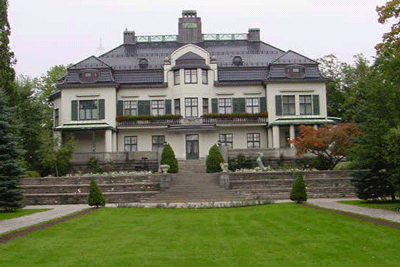
"Villa Otium", the residence of the U.S. Ambassador in Oslo, Norway (Nobels gate 28)

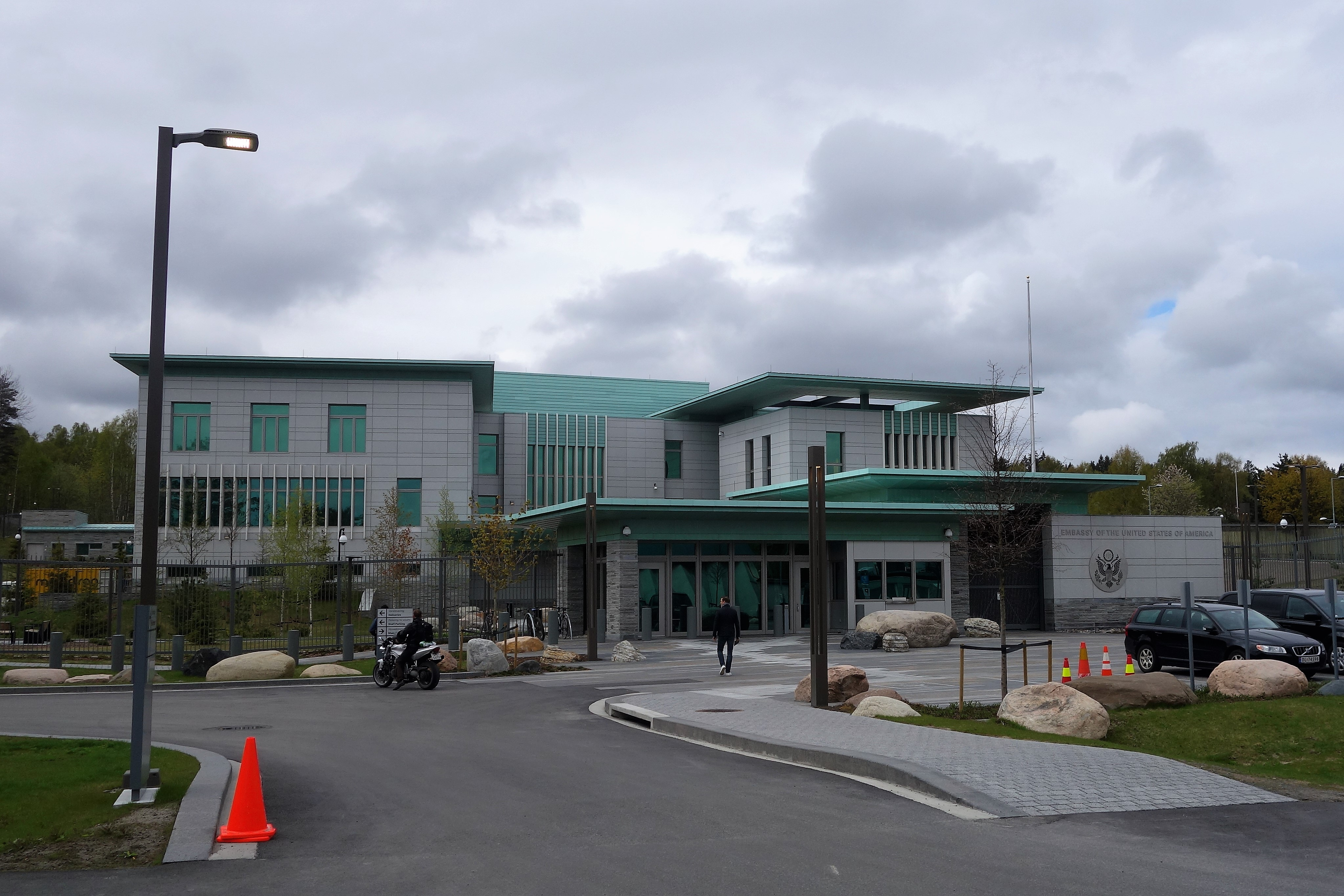
The current U.S. Embassy in Oslo (Morgedalsveien 36)

Name	Portrait	Appointment	Presentation	Termination	Appointer	Notes
Charles H. Graves		March 8, 1905	May 31, 1905	August 6, 1906	Theodore Roosevelt	Left post
Herbert H. D. Peirce		June 22, 1906	August 13, 1906	May 30, 1911	Theodore Roosevelt	Left post
Laurits S. Swenson		April 27, 1911	June 10, 1911	October 4, 1913	William H. Taft	Left post
Albert G. Schmedeman		July 21, 1913	October 4, 1913	July 29, 1921	Woodrow Wilson	Left post
Laurits S. Swenson		October 8, 1921	November 28, 1921	November 9, 1930	Warren G. Harding	Left post
Hoffman Philip		July 22, 1930	November 15, 1930	August 3, 1935	Herbert Hoover	Left post
Anthony J. Drexel Biddle, Jr.		July 22, 1935	September 7, 1935	May 21, 1937	Franklin D. Roosevelt	Left post
Florence Jaffray Harriman		May 4, 1937	July 1, 1937	April 22, 1940	Franklin D. Roosevelt	Left Norway because of WWII, first female ambassador to Norway
Anthony J. Drexel Biddle, Jr.		February 11, 1941	March 20, 1941	December 1, 1943	Franklin D. Roosevelt	Left London, where the government of Norway went into exile
Lithgow Osborne		September 21, 1944	December 20, 1944	April 20, 1946	Franklin D. Roosevelt	Left post
Charles Ulrick Bay		June 6, 1946	July 26, 1946	July 31, 1953	Harry S. Truman	Left post
Lester Corrin Strong		June 24, 1953	August 10, 1953	February 16, 1957	Dwight D. Eisenhower	Left post
Frances E. Willis		May 20, 1957	June 19, 1957	May 15, 1961	Dwight D. Eisenhower	Left post
Clifton R. Wharton, Sr.		March 2, 1961	April 18, 1961	September 4, 1964	John F. Kennedy	Left post
Margaret Joy Tibbetts		July 31, 1964	October 6, 1964	May 23, 1969	Lyndon B. Johnson	Left post
Philip K. Crowe		May 1, 1969	June 23, 1969	August 31, 1973	Richard Nixon	Left post
Thomas Ryan Byrne		August 3, 1973	October 4, 1973	April 10, 1976	Richard Nixon	Left post
William A. Anders		April 13, 1976	May 11, 1976	June 18, 1977	Gerald R. Ford	Left post
Louis A. Lerner		July 15, 1977	August 23, 1977	January 28, 1980	Jimmy Carter	Left post
Sidney Anders Rand		December 20, 1979	March 4, 1980	February 14, 1981	Jimmy Carter	Left post
Mark Evans Austad		December 11, 1981	January 5, 1982	September 15, 1984	Ronald Reagan	Left post
R. Douglas Stuart Jr.		September 18, 1984	October 16, 1984	July 17, 1989	Ronald Reagan	Left post
Loret Miller Ruppe		August 7, 1989	August 29, 1989	February 28, 1993	George H. W. Bush	Left post
Thomas A. Loftus		November 4, 1993	November 18, 1993	December 22, 1997	Bill Clinton	Left post
David Hermelin		November 10, 1997	January 8, 1998	January 7, 2000	Bill Clinton	Left post
Robin Chandler Duke		August 3, 2000	September 12, 2000	March 1, 2001	Bill Clinton	Left post
John D. Ong		January 30, 2002	February 27, 2002	November 21, 2005	George W. Bush	Left post
Benson K. Whitney		November 2, 2005	January 12, 2006	June 20, 2009	George W. Bush	Left post
Barry B. White		September 23, 2009	November 5, 2009	September 28, 2013	Barack Obama	Left post
Samuel D. Heins		February 16, 2016	March 10, 2016	January 12, 2017	Barack Obama	Left post
Kenneth Braithwaite		December 21, 2017	February 8, 2018	May 29, 2020	Donald Trump	Left post
Marc Nathanson		May 5, 2022	June 16, 2022	February 14, 2024	Joe Biden	Left post
Michael E. Kavoukjian		August 7, 2026	November 5, 2026	Present	Donald Trump	

== See also ==
- Embassy of the United States, Oslo
- Norway – United States relations
- Foreign relations of Norway
- Ambassadors of the United States
