= Louis A. Lerner =

American publisher and diplomat (1935–1984)

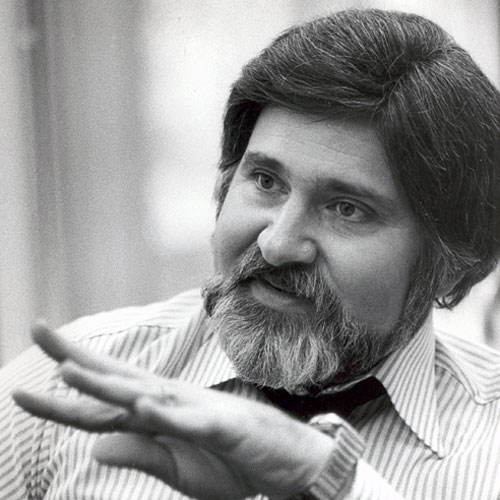

United States Ambassador to Norway
- In office August 23, 1977 – January 28, 1980
- President: Jimmy Carter
- Preceded by: William A. Anders
- Succeeded by: Sidney Rand

Personal details
- Born: Louis Abraham Lerner; June 12, 1935 Chicago, Illinois, U.S.
- Died: November 14, 1984 (aged 49) Chicago, Illinois, U.S.
- Party: Democratic
- Spouse: Susan Lerner
- Children: Two daughters
- Education: Roosevelt University

Louis Abraham Lerner (June 12, 1935 – November 14, 1984) was an American businessman, publisher, political activist and ambassador. He received a B.A. in 1960 from Roosevelt University. In 1956–57, he studied Scandinavian affairs in Denmark. Lerner's father was publisher Leo Lerner.

== Career ==
He was assistant to the publisher, later executive vice president and the publisher of Lerner Home Newspapers.

Lerner was active in many of Chicago's cultural organizations. He was a member of the board of directors of the Lyric Opera Guild of Chicago and a director and vice president of the Chicago Public Library. Lerner was a member of the Illinois Advisory Committee on the State Library from 1969 to 1977 and a member of the National Commission on Libraries and Informational Sciences from 1972 to 1977. He also served as a trustee of the American Scandinavian Foundation, the Planned Parenthood Federation and the American Council for United States and Italy at the time of his death.

Lerner was for several years politically active for the Democratic Party in Chicago.

Louis A. Lerner was appointed U.S. Ambassador to Norway by President Jimmy Carter on July 15, 1977 (Presentation of Credentials took place on August 23, 1977, to King Olav V of Norway), where Lerner stayed in office in Oslo until January 28, 1980.

Louis A. Lerner died of cancer in Chicago on November 14, 1984, only 49 years of age. He left behind a wife, Susan and two daughters, Jane and Lucy.

Diplomatic posts
| Preceded by William A. Anders | U.S. Ambassador to Norway; 1977–1980 | Succeeded by Sidney Rand |
