= Kenneth Braithwaite =

American government official and diplomat (born 1960)

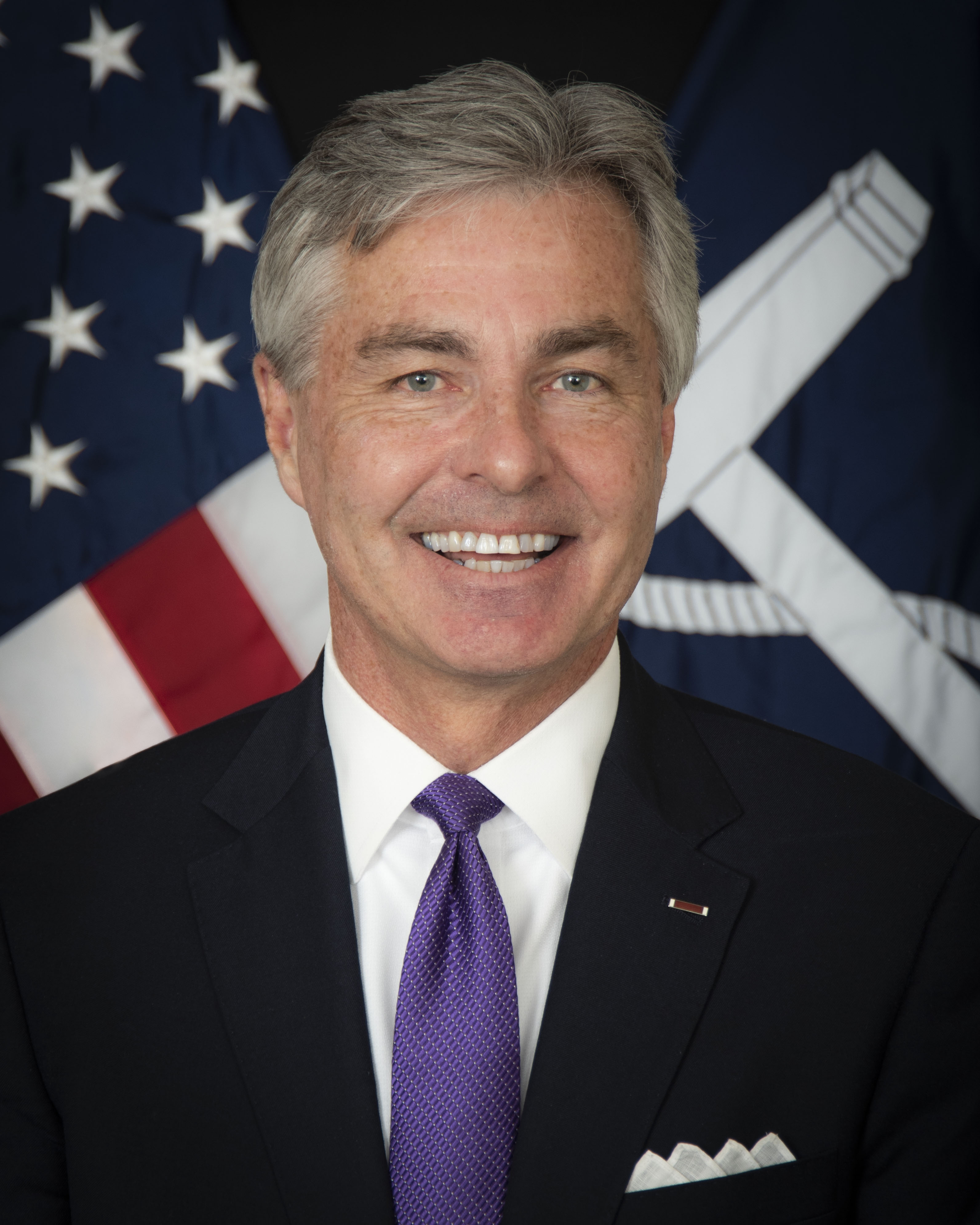
- Official portrait, 2020

77th United States Secretary of the Navy
- In office May 29, 2020 – January 20, 2021
- President: Donald Trump
- Deputy: Gregory J. Slavonic (acting)
- Secretary: Mark Esper; Christopher C. Miller (acting)
- Preceded by: Richard V. Spencer
- Succeeded by: Carlos Del Toro

31st United States Ambassador to Norway
- In office February 8, 2018 – May 29, 2020
- President: Donald Trump
- Preceded by: Samuel D. Heins
- Succeeded by: Marc Nathanson

Personal details
- Born: Kenneth John Braithwaite II; December 24, 1960 (age 65) Livonia, Michigan, U.S.
- Party: Republican
- Children: 2
- Education: United States Naval Academy (BS); University of Pennsylvania (MPA)

Military service
- Allegiance: United States
- Branch/service: United States Navy
- Years of service: 1984–1993 (active); 1993–2011 (reserve)
- Rank: Rear Admiral (lower half)
- Battles/wars: Gulf War; Iraq War
- Awards: Legion of Merit; Defense Meritorious Service Medal; Combat Action Ribbon

Kenneth John Braithwaite II (born December 24, 1960) is an American diplomat, businessman, and former United States Navy rear admiral who served as the 77th secretary of the Navy from 2020 to 2021, in the first Trump administration. A member of the Republican Party, he previously served as the 31st U.S. ambassador to Norway from 2018 to 2020.

== Early life and education ==
Braithwaite was born on December 24, 1960, and is from Livonia, Michigan. He attended the United States Naval Academy and graduated with a bachelor's degree in naval engineering and political science in 1984. He later earned a master's degree in government administration from the University of Pennsylvania, Fels Institute of Government, in 1995.

Braithwaite obtained additional graduate qualifications from the Naval War College in Newport, Rhode Island, as well as the Air Command and Staff College at the Maxwell Air Force Base in Montgomery, Alabama.

== Military career ==
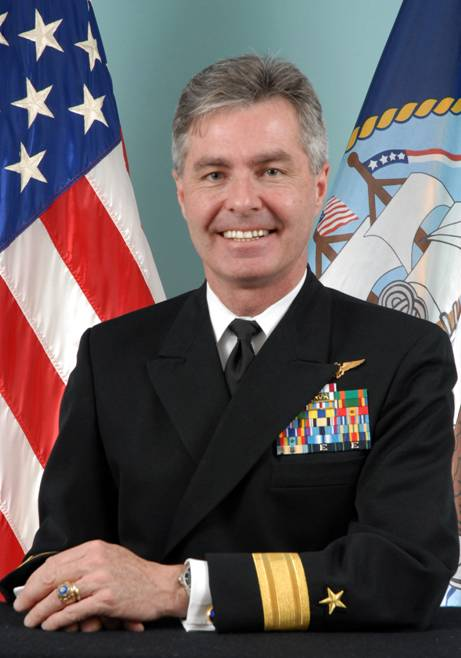
Official portrait of Rear Admiral Braithwaite, c. 2007

Braithwaite was commissioned as an ensign in 1984, and was initially selected as a special assistant in the Office of Legislative Affairs on Capitol Hill. He became a naval aviator in April 1986 and was assigned to anti-submarine patrol missions with Patrol Squadron 17 out of Naval Air Station Barbers Point, Hawaii. In April 1988 he was reassigned to public affairs duties as director of public affairs aboard the aircraft carrier USS America (CV-66), and in 1990 he became the chief of public affairs to the commander of Philadelphia Naval Shipyard. He made NATO deployments to the Mediterranean Sea and Indian Ocean in response to the start of the Gulf War.

Braithwaite's active duty service ended in 1993, but he immediately joined the Navy Reserve. From 1993 until 2002, he served in different roles with numerous commands, including the 6th Fleet, 7th Fleet, U.S. Pacific Fleet and Commander Carrier Group Two.

In 2002, he was selected as commanding officer of Navy Combat Camera Atlantic (Reserve) and during the 2003 invasion of Iraq, he was deployed with his command in support of combat operations. In 2004, he was selected as the director of the Joint Public Affairs Support Element-Reserve, part of Joint Enabling Capabilities Command. In this role, he commanded a 50-person joint public affairs expeditionary unit that was forward deployed to support Combatant Commanders in time of conflict. In 2005, he deployed to Islamabad, Pakistan to serve as the director of Strategic Communications, concurrently reporting to the commander for Disaster Response and to the U.S. ambassador to Pakistan.

He was nominated to the rank of rear admiral (lower half) in early 2007 while serving as director of the Joint Public Affairs Support Element at Norfolk. His promotion was approved by the U.S. Senate that June. He served as the Navy's vice chief of Information until his retirement in June 2011.

== Business career ==
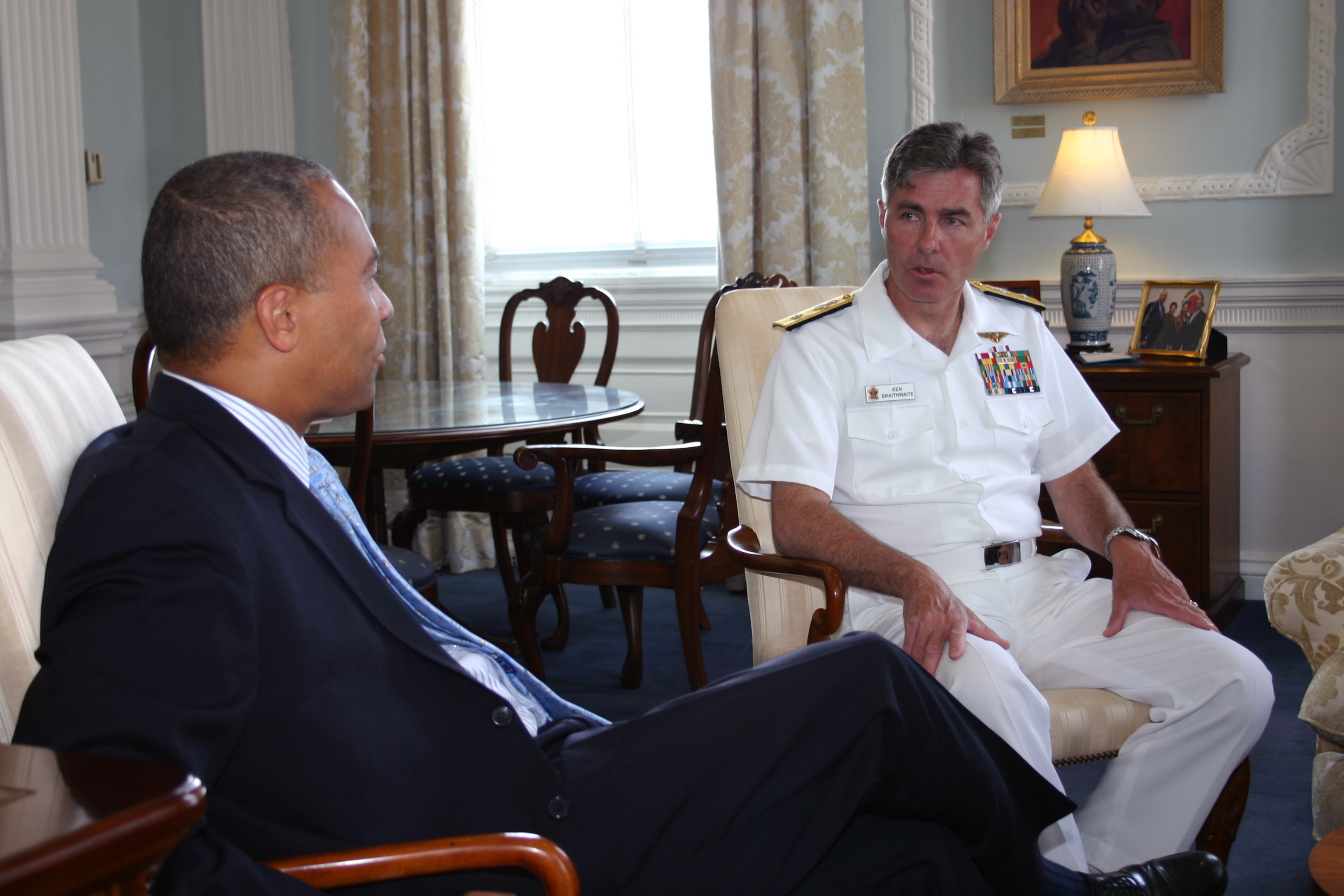
Braithwaite, then-vice chief of Information, meets with Massachusetts Governor Deval Patrick on July 1, 2008

Upon leaving active duty in June 1993, Braithwaite enrolled at the University of Pennsylvania. Shortly thereafter he was hired by Atlantic Richfield (ARCO) as Manager of Operations where he managed a multi-disciplined, union-represented workforce. He was later assigned to ARCO's Washington DC office to work on regulatory affairs.

From 1993 to 1996, Braithwaite was town councilman for the borough of Ridley Park, Pennsylvania. He later became a top advisor for former U.S. Senator Arlen Specter of Pennsylvania from 1997 to 2000, serving as his state director.

In 2000, Braithwaite became vice president of advocacy and government relations for St. Thomas Health systems, serving in the role until 2002 when he became vice president public and government affairs for Ascension Health in Washington D.C. In 2007, he became a senior vice president of the Hospital and Healthsystem Association of Pennsylvania, where he led the Delaware Valley Healthcare Council division. Braithwaite later became a group senior vice president at health care company Vizient.

=== Cambridge Analytica ===
In January 2020, CBS News reported that leaked documents indicated that Braithwaite may have had a contractual relationship with Cambridge Analytica before he became ambassador to Norway. Braithwaite denied having entered into a contract with Cambridge Analytica, saying he only conducted short-lived discussions with the company, only informally provided advice, and that he only entered into a non-disclosure agreement.

Citizens for Responsibility and Ethics in Washington suggested that he had a conflict of interest when he presented the U.S. Ambassador's Award to Norwegian shipping magnate Thomas Wilhelmsen because Wilhelmsen's cousin and co-heir to the Wilhelmsen company Olympia Paus is married to Alexander Nix, the former CEO of Cambridge Analytica. Braithwaite denied that he had a conflict of interest.

== Donald Trump administration ==
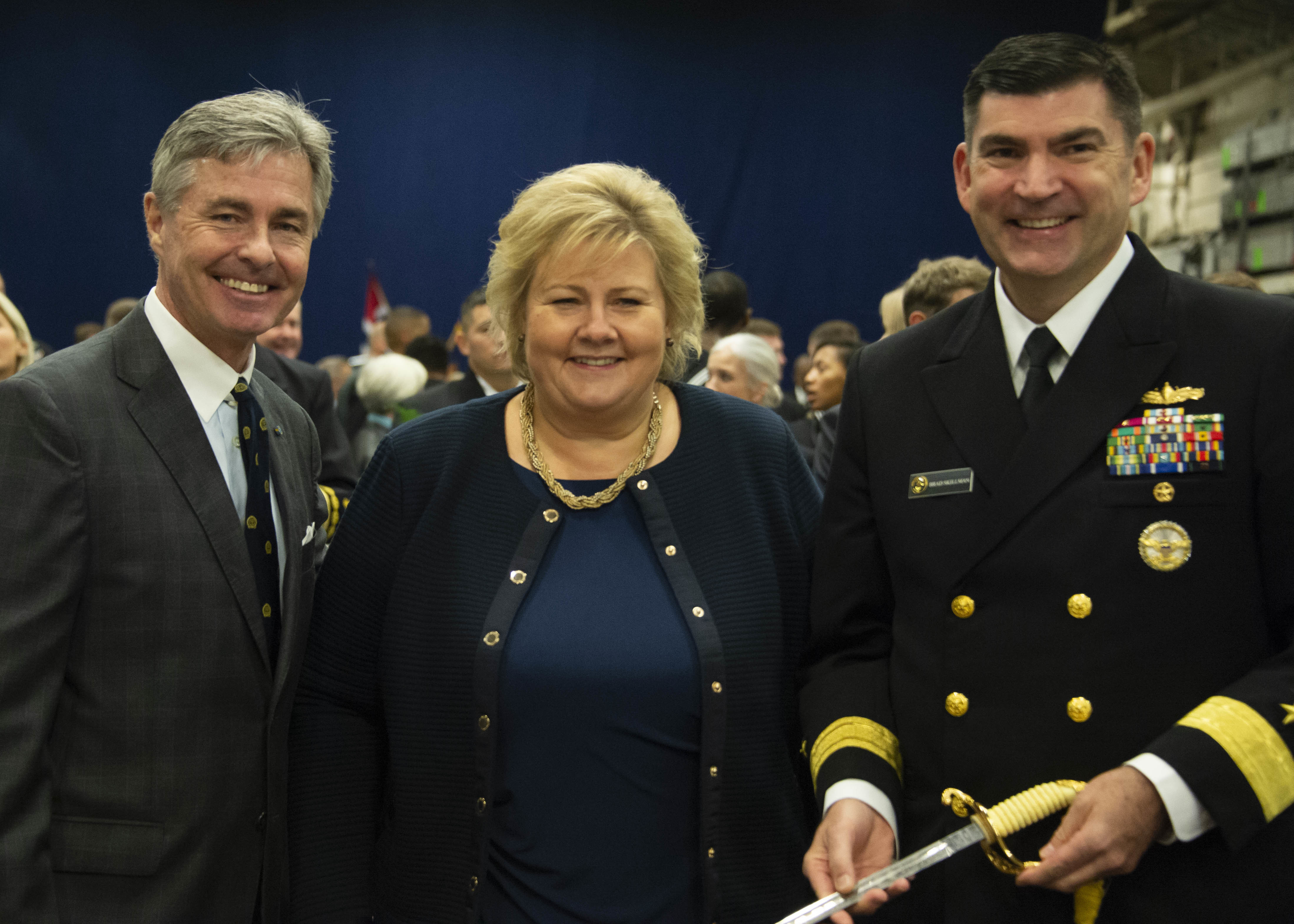
Braithwaite with Norwegian Prime Minister Erna Solberg and John Skillman, on November 15, 2018

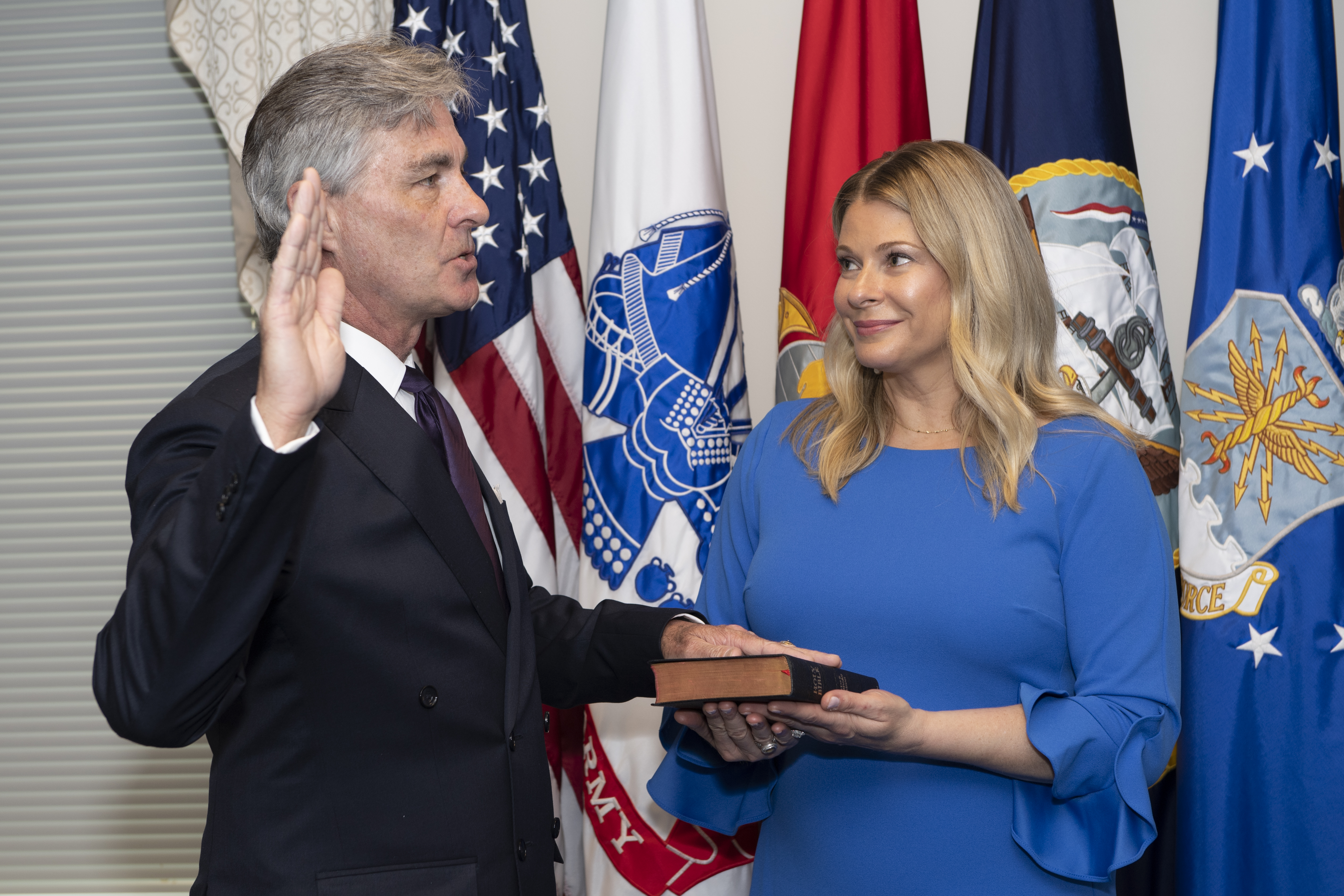
Braithwaite being sworn in as the 77th U.S. secretary of the Navy, with his wife Melissa holding the Bible, on May 29, 2020

Braithwaite was nominated by President Donald Trump to serve as the U.S. ambassador to Norway. His nomination was confirmed by the U.S. Senate on December 21, 2017, by voice vote.

In November 2019, Trump announced he would nominate Braithwaite to become the U.S. Navy Secretary, after Richard V. Spencer was forced to resign. Braithwaite testified during his May 2020 confirmation hearings that he would prioritize rebuilding trust in naval leadership after two fatal ship collisions in 2017 and an earlier bribery scandal. He was sworn into office on May 29, 2020.

In November 2020, Braithwaite proposed reconstituting the First Fleet as the United States Pacific Fleet, citing the need for increased US Navy presence in the Indo-Pacific, and pointing to Chinese incursions in the region.

In December 2020, Braithwaite created the “Tri-Service” strategy to align the Navy, Marines, and Coast Guard and outlined a “more assertive posture” to deter military adventurism by Russia and China.

In January 2021, Braithwaite led the creation of a strategy to protect marine resources and shipping routes in the Arctic by increasing the Navy’s presence in the region.

In his eight months as Secretary of the Navy, Braithwaite incurred about $2.4 million in taxpayer-funded travel costs. While other senior civilian staff reduced their travel due to the COVID-19 pandemic, Braithwaite travelled more than any other senior Pentagon civilian. The week before Joe Biden's inauguration, Braithwaite spent $232,000 to fly to Wake Island, a tiny atoll where no sailors or Marines are stationed. He spent more than $24,000 to attend the Army–Navy football game. He made more than one visit to Hawaii. Braithwaite defended his extensive travel, saying, "I submit it's impossible to lead men and women deployed around the world from behind a desk in Washington."

== Awards and decorations ==
Braithwaite's personal awards include the Legion of Merit, Defense Meritorious Service Medal with Oak leaf cluster, Meritorious Service Medal, Navy and Marine Corps Commendation Medal with Combat “V”, Navy Achievement Medal, the Combat Action Ribbon and various other awards.

== Personal life ==
Braithwaite is married to Melissa Losito Braithwaite and they have a daughter and a son.

Diplomatic posts
Preceded by Samuel D. Heins	United States Ambassador to Norway; 2018–2020	Succeeded by Richard Riley; Acting
Political offices
Preceded by James E. McPherson; Acting	United States Secretary of the Navy; 2020–2021	Succeeded by Thomas Harker; Acting
