= Frances E. Willis =

American diplomat (1899–1983)

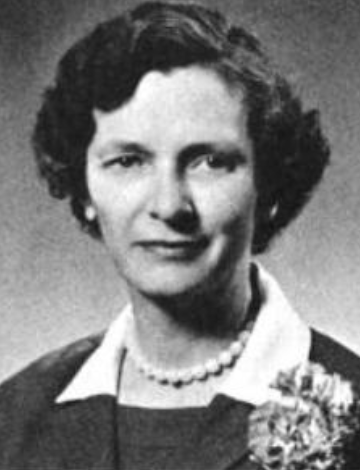
- Frances E. Willis, from a 1962 publication of the U.S. State Department
- Born: May 20, 1899; Metropolis, Illinois, U.S.
- Died: July 23, 1983 (aged 84); Redlands, California, U.S.
- Occupations: Diplomat; foreign service officer
- Known for: U.S. ambassador to Switzerland, Norway and Sri Lanka

Frances Elizabeth Willis (May 20, 1899, Metropolis IL – July 23, 1983, Redlands CA) was an American diplomat who served as the U.S. ambassador to Switzerland, Norway and Sri Lanka. She was the third woman to enter the U.S. Foreign Service in 1927 and the first woman to make a career of it.

== Early life and education ==
Frances Willis graduated from Stanford University with an AB (Phi Beta Kappa) in History in 1920 and received a Ph.D. in political science from Stanford in 1923, becoming the first person to receive a doctorate in political science from Stanford. She taught history at Goucher College for one year, then political science at Vassar College as an assistant professor from 1924 to 1927.

She entered the Civil Service in 1927 because "the more I taught, the more I realized how little I actually knew about Government. I decided to find out firsthand what it was like."

== Foreign Service career ==
Willis held posts starting in Chile in 1928, then Sweden, Belgium and Spain during WW II, the U.S. State Department, England, Finland, Switzerland, Norway and Sri Lanka. She was appointed ambassador to the last three posts, retiring at 65 from Sri Lanka in 1964. During her Foreign Service career she became the first woman designated chargé d'affaires, the first woman appointed deputy chief of mission, the first female Foreign Service officer (FSO) appointed ambassador, the first woman to serve as ambassador to three posts, the first woman appointed Career Minister in 1955 and the first woman appointed to the rank of Career Ambassador in 1962. In 1963, Willis was a recipient of the prestigious Career Service Award, given to the most outstanding Foreign Service Officers in the Department of State.

Frances Willis was stationed as a Second Secretary in Brussels, Belgium, when WW II broke out in May 1940. The Nazi quickly invaded Belgium and occupied Brussels. Henry Luce and Clare Boothe Luce had been visiting the Ambassador during the invasion, and Willis drove them through German lines to Paris where they were subsequently evacuated back to the U.S.

In 1953 Dwight Eisenhower appointed her as the first United States Ambassador to Switzerland; she served in that role until 1957. While serving as ambassador she was the only woman to attend the Big Four Summit Conference in Geneva. Her appointment caused some unease to the thoroughly conservative Swiss government, which struggled to find a proper form of address for a "Fräulein" ambassador. The New York Times covered the appointment under the title "Slap at Anti-Feminist Swiss", linking it to the Swiss refusal to allow women to vote. Even more diplomatic headaches were caused by Willis' frank anti-Communist rhetoric, which enraged the Swiss left-wing press. The Swiss government asked the national press agency to give less coverage to her public appearances.

Willis also served as Ambassador to Norway from 1957 until 1961, and Ambassador to Sri Lanka, then called Ceylon, from 1961 until 1964.

== Later life ==
Willis retired in 1964 to Redlands, California.

After her retirement she was appointed U.S. delegate to the 20th United Nations General Assembly's Third Commission Human Rights and Social Development, working with Arthur Goldberg. In 1966 she was appointed head of the U.S. Delegation to the Fifteenth Session of the Kennedy Round of Tariffs in Geneva. She was also appointed chairman (as she insisted on calling her title) of the University of Redlands Johnston College Board of Overseers and Long Range Planning Committee.

She appeared as a guest contestant on the June 2, 1957 episode of What's My Line?.

The Frances E. Willis Papers, 1906–1983, are held in the Hoover Institution Archives at Stanford.

Willis' nephew Nicholas J. Willis wrote her biography, titled Frances Elizabeth Willis: Up the Foreign Service Ladder to the Summit — Despite the Limitations of Her Sex.

== Honors and awards ==
Among WIllis's honors are Woman of the Year (one of seven), Los Angeles Times, 1953; Dr. of Law, University of Redlands, 1954, Western College of Women, 1955; Eminent Achievement, American Woman's Association, 1955; Dr. of Law, Mills College, 1956; Dr. of Humane Letters, University of Rochester, 1960; Career Service Award, National Civil Service League, 1962; Hollins Medal (one of nine), Hollins College, 1968; Dr. of Humane Letter, University of California, Riverside, 1968; Foreign Service Cup, American Foreign Service Association, 1973. This last award cited her "outstanding contribution to the conduct of foreign relations of the United States."

In 2006 Frances Willis was honored by the U.S. Postal Service, which issued a six-stamp pane of "Distinguished American Diplomats."

Diplomatic posts
Preceded by post created	United States Ambassador to Switzerland and Liechtenstein; 1953–1957	Succeeded by Henry J. Taylor
Preceded by Lester Corrin Strong	United States Ambassador to Norway; 1957–1961	Succeeded by Clifton R. Wharton Sr.
Preceded by Bernard Gufler	United States Ambassador to Sri Lanka; 1961–1964	Succeeded by Cecil B. Lyon
