= Sidney Rand (ambassador) =

American Lutheran minister, educator, ambassador and college president

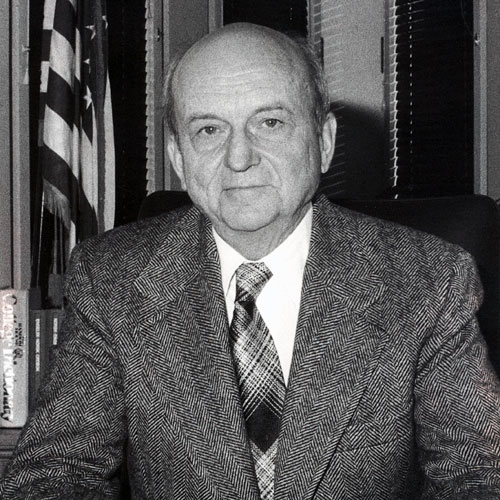

United States Ambassador to Norway
- In office March 4, 1980 – February 14, 1981
- President: Jimmy Carter; Ronald Reagan
- Preceded by: Louis A. Lerner
- Succeeded by: Mark Evans Austad

Personal details
- Born: Sidney Anders Rand; May 9, 1916 Eldred, Minnesota, U.S.
- Died: December 16, 2003 (aged 87) Northfield, Minnesota, U.S.
- Spouses: Dorothy Holm Rand (m. 1942; died 1974); Lois Ekeren Rand (m. 1974–2003)
- Education: Concordia College

Sidney Anders Rand (May 9, 1916 – December 16, 2003) was an American Lutheran minister, educator and college president. He served under the Carter administration as United States Ambassador to Norway from 1980 to 1981.

== Background ==
Rand was born in Eldred, Minnesota, to Charles W. and Alice Pedersen Rand. He lived in Beltrami and Williams, Minnesota, where his father was Superintendent of Schools. Following his father's death in 1920, the family moved to Rothsay, Minnesota, his mother's hometown. He graduated in 1938 from Concordia College, was ordained at the Lutheran Seminary in St. Paul in 1943 and served as a pastor in northern Minnesota.

== Career ==
Rand joined the Concordia College faculty in 1945. He was president of Waldorf College in Forest City, Iowa, from 1951 to 1956, when he became executive director of college education for the Evangelical Lutheran Church in Minneapolis. In July 1963, he became President of St. Olaf College, Northfield, Minnesota and served in that capacity until February, 1980, at which time he became United States Ambassador to Norway. The Norwegian government recognized Ambassador Rand for his services in promoting good relations between the two countries. He was awarded the Knight First Class — Order of St. Olav and the Commander of the Royal Norwegian Order of Merit.

He retired in Minneapolis during 1981. He later taught part-time at Luther Seminary in St. Paul and served as a consultant to colleges on management studies. He served as interim President of two colleges, Augustana College, Sioux Falls, South Dakota (1986–87 and 1992–93) and Suomi College (now Finlandia University), Hancock, Michigan (1990–91). Rand was a member of the Norwegian-American Historical Association and was inducted into the Scandinavian-American Hall of Fame at the 1987 Norsk Hostfest in Minot, N.D.

== Rand Scholar Award ==
The Rand Scholar Award was established at St. Olaf College. it was named in honor of former college president Sidney Anders Rand.

Diplomatic posts
Preceded by Louis A. Lerner	U.S. Ambassador to Norway; 1980–1981	Succeeded by Mark Evans Austad
