= Charles Ulrick Bay =

American businessman and diplomat

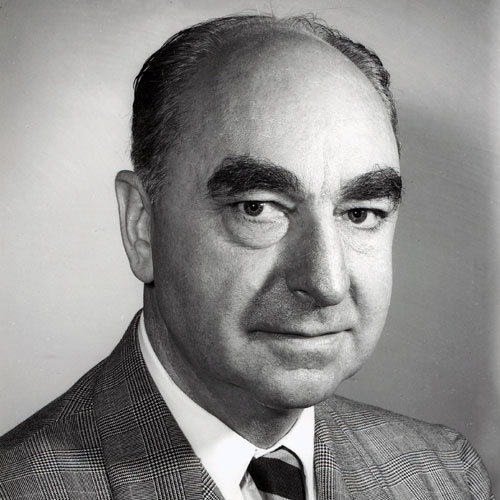

United States Ambassador to Norway
- In office July 26, 1946 – July 31, 1953
- President: Harry Truman; Dwight Eisenhower
- Preceded by: Lithgow Osborne
- Succeeded by: Lester Corrin Strong

Personal details
- Born: September 5, 1888 Rensselaer, New York, U.S.
- Died: December 31, 1955 (aged 67) New York City, New York, U.S.

Charles Ulrick Bay (September 5, 1888 – December 31, 1955) was an American businessman and diplomat. He was the United States Ambassador to Norway from 1946 to 1953.

== Biography ==
Bay operated an oil company and served in the Office of Strategic Services.

Bay was a politically appointed ambassador and was nominated for the embassy mission by President Harry S. Truman. He presented his credentials as the second U.S. ambassador to Norway after World War II on July 26, 1946, to King Haakon VII of Norway and served until July 31, 1953.

Bay provided support for charitable and humanitarian purposes. Through a foundation, he funded the rescue boat of the Norwegian Society for Sea Rescue (Redningsselskapet), RS 62 Ambassador Bay, launched in 1958.

Bay had family ties to Norway and special interest in American - Norwegian relations as an ambassador. He was much in favor of Norwegian membership in NATO and economic cooperation in many ways between the United States and Norway.

His mother came from Hammerfest and his father's relatives came from Drøbak. Haakon Hauan was Bay's uncle. Bay donated fountains with sculptures to both Drøbak and Hammerfest. He was married to Josephine Perfect Bay from 1942 until his death.

Diplomatic posts
Preceded by Lithgow Osborne	United States Ambassador to Norway; July 26, 1946 – July 31, 1953	Succeeded by Lester Corrin Strong
