= Lithgow Osborne =

American career diplomat

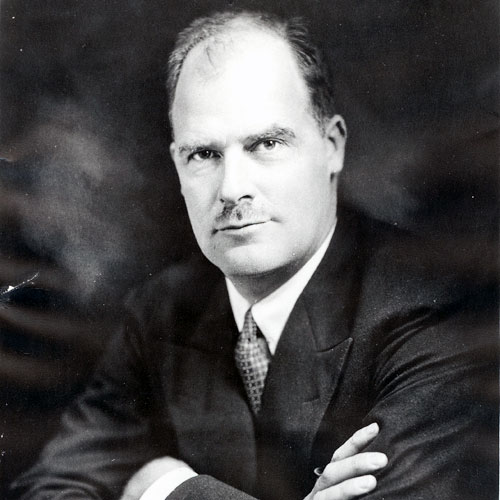

United States Ambassador to Norway
- In office December 20, 1944 – April 20, 1946
- President: Franklin D. Roosevelt
- Preceded by: Anthony J. Drexel Biddle, Jr.
- Succeeded by: Charles Ulrick Bay

Personal details
- Born: 1892 Auburn, New York, U.S.
- Died: 1980 (aged 87–88)
- Spouse: Countess Lillie Raben-Levetzau
- Children: 3 sons
- Parent: Thomas Mott Osborne (father)
- Education: Harvard University

Lithgow Osborne (1892 - 1980) was an American career diplomat. Lithgow Osborne was the third son of Thomas Mott Osborne. He was the United States ambassador to Norway from 1944 to 1946.

== Career ==
When Lithgow Osborne was in the middle of his senior year at Harvard University in 1914, Joseph C. Grew snapped him up for an assignment in the United States Embassy in Berlin as a private secretary to Ambassador James W. Gerard. Lithgow Osborne was plunged into the diplomatic and social life of World War I wartime Germany.

Osborne was transferred to the American Legation in Havana before President Wilson broke U.S. relations with Germany. Because of his familiarity with European affairs he was soon returned to the Continent as Secretary of the American Legation in Copenhagen.

After the first World War Osborne returned to Washington, D.C. where he worked within the State Department for a few years.

In 1922 he became the vice-president and editorial writer of the Auburn Citizen-Advertiser. In 1932 Osborne was back in government when Governor Herbert H. Lehman appointed him Commissioner of Conservation. After another ten years he departed Albany for Washington and a desk in the Office of Strategic Services (OSS).

== Ambassador ==
On September 21, 1944, President Franklin D. Roosevelt appointed Osborne as Ambassador to Norway, a post he held until May, 1946. On December 20 the same year Osborne presented his credentials as ambassador to King Haakon VII of Norway (in exile during World War II) in London and served until April 20, 1946. After taking care of the relationship with Norwegian exiles in London during World War II, Osborne moved to Oslo after the liberation in May 1945. His main post war tasks were to re-establish the good relations between the United States and the lawful Government of Norway on Norwegian soil, to make the United States Embassy in Oslo work efficiently again as well as to unite the United States' aid to the rebuilding of Norway after the war.

For several years after his return from Oslo, Lithgow Osborne was chairman of the board of trustees for the American Scandinavian Foundation.

In 1954 he helped draft the original Declaration of Atlantic Unity, which was both a statement of purpose and an agency designed to bolster the North Atlantic Treaty Organization (NATO).

Diplomatic posts
Preceded by Anthony J. Drexel Biddle, Jr.	U.S. Ambassador to Norway; 1944–1946	Succeeded by Charles Ulrick Bay
