= William A. Crawford =

American diplomat and ambassador (1915-2001)

1st United States Ambassador to Romania
- In office December 24, 1964 – October 10, 1965
- President: Lyndon B. Johnson
- Preceded by: Himself as Minister
- Succeeded by: Richard H. Davis

23rd United States Minister to Romania
- In office February 10, 1962 – December 24, 1964
- President: John F. Kennedy; Lyndon B. Johnson
- Preceded by: Clifton Reginald Wharton Sr.
- Succeeded by: Himself as Ambassador

Personal details
- Born: January 14, 1915 New York City, New York, U.S.
- Died: December 14, 2001 (aged 86) Bethesda, Maryland, U.S.
- Spouse(s): Barbara Gardner (m. 1940; died 1979) Gudrun Hadell
- Children: 5
- Education: Haverford College (BA)
- Occupation: Diplomat

William Avery Crawford (January 14, 1915 – December 14, 2001) was an American diplomat who served as the last Minister and first United States Ambassador to Romania, from 1962 to 1965.

== Early life and education ==
Crawford was born on January 14, 1915; the son of John Raymond Crawford, a professor of Greek and Latin at Lafayette College, and Pauline Avery.

Educated abroad in France, he studied at Haverford College, and went abroad to Spain during the Spanish Civil War. He graduated in 1936 with a Bachelor of Arts. He later studied at the Russian Institute, now known as the Harriman Institute, at Columbia University.

After graduation, Crawford worked at a department store before joining the diplomatic corps.

== Diplomacy ==
Crawford joined the United States Foreign Service in 1941, serving in Moscow, Paris, Havana, and Prague. Although subjected to a loyalty investigation under Executive Order 9835 in 1951, he passed, and continued his work in the Foreign Service. He was chosen to be Minister in October 1961.

In February 1962, he presented his credentials as Minister, serving until the post was upgraded to Ambassador in 1964. During this time, he helped to support Romania-United States relations in the fields of trade and cultural exchange.

He and his wife, Barbara, founded the American International School of Bucharest in 1962.

Crawford left his post in October 1965.

== Later career ==
After Romania, Crawford was an assistant to Lyman Lemnitzer, the Supreme Allied Commander Europe, from 1965 to 1967. He retired from the Foreign Service in 1970.

He then taught at the Landon School, worked at a marketing company, finished his memoirs, and contributed to a biography on his mother.

== Personal life and death ==
Crawford was married twice: first to Barbara Gardner, from October 19, 1940, till her death in September 1979; and then to Gudrun Hadell.

From his first marriage, he had five children: two sons and three

daughters.[11]

Crawford died at his home on December 14, 2001, at age 86. He was survived by his children and his second wife.

Diplomatic posts
| Preceded by Clifton Reginald Wharton Sr. | United States Minister to Romania; 1962 – 1964 | Succeeded by Himself as Ambassador |
| Preceded by Himself as Minister | United States Ambassador to Romania; 1964 – 1965 | Succeeded by Richard H. Davis |
