= Mark Evans Austad =

American ambassador (1917–1988)

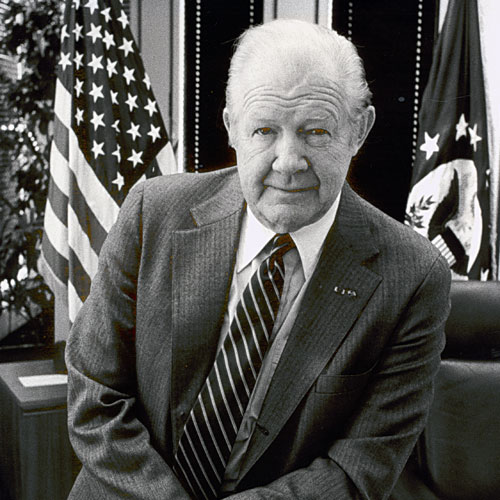

United States Ambassador to Norway
- In office January 5, 1982 – September 15, 1984
- President: Ronald Reagan
- Preceded by: Sidney Anders Rand
- Succeeded by: R. Douglas Stuart Jr.

United States Ambassador to Finland
- In office March 20, 1975 – April 14, 1977
- President: Gerald Ford
- Preceded by: V. John Krehbiel
- Succeeded by: Rozanne L. Ridgway

Personal details
- Born: Marcus Jacob Austad; April 1, 1917 Ogden, Utah, U.S.
- Died: October 20, 1988 (aged 71) Arizona, U.S.
- Party: Republican
- Spouse: Lola Brown Austad
- Children: 3

Mark Evans Austad (April 1, 1917 – October 20, 1988) was an American radio and television commentator in Washington D.C. (under the name Mark Evans), and served under Gerald Ford as United States Ambassador to Finland from 1975 to 1977, and as United States Ambassador to Norway from 1981 to 1984, under Ronald Reagan.

== Biography ==
Austad was born Marcus Jacob Austad in Ogden, Utah, to Norwegian immigrant parents, Jacob L. and Signa Anderson Austad. He was a member of the Church of Jesus Christ of Latter-day Saints (LDS Church) and served a three-year mission to Finland and Norway from 1936 to 1939. From 1939 to 1941, he attended Weber College in Ogden where he was student body president and active in public speaking, in which he won first place in national competitions. Austad married the former Lola Brown in 1942 and they had three daughters.

Throughout his life Austad was active in the LDS Church, and in addition to his missionary service he was also a Sunday School teacher in the 1970s in Washington, D.C., and was ordained as a High Priest.

=== Broadcasting ===
Austad passed up law school for an opportunity to work in radio as an announcer with KSL in Salt Lake City in 1941. He was soon drafted into the U.S. Army Intelligence Corps for service during World War II. To treat a pre-existing knee injury, he was sent to Walter Reed General Hospital in Washington, D.C., where he was also assigned to the hospital's public address system referred to as WRGH. Among his duties was hosting a weekly program with prominent Washington personalities, such as First Lady Eleanor Roosevelt. In late 1942 Austad also worked part-time for WWDC and then full-time upon his military discharge in 1945. After two years, he moved to the CBS station WTOP where he succeeded Arthur Godfrey on his own morning show.

Starting in 1960, Austad became a commentator at WTTG television and in 1961 he became vice president of public affairs at Metropolitan Broadcasting Company, later called Metromedia, where he stayed until 1981. During this time he continued to host other television shows such as "Panorama Potomac", "Face to Face", "The Mark Evans Show", and "Opinion in the Capitol", which he hosted for 25 years. He was also involved with television documentaries, including an award-winner on pollution called 1985, several on world topics, and one on his visit with Albert Schweitzer.

=== Civic activity ===
Austad participated with various civic and national organizations. He served as a member of the citizens advisory board of the Peace Corps (appointed by President Richard Nixon), a member of the executive board of the Washington, D.C., American Red Cross, a member of the public affairs committee of the United States Chamber of Commerce, a member of the board of the Arizona Heart Institute, a member of the board of the Disabled American Veterans, and a trustee of the American Automobile Association. He received the Silver Beaver Award and in 1970 he was named Scouter of the Year by the National Capital Area Council of the Boy Scouts of America, where he participated for over 25 years. He was invited on eight occasions to speak before the National Geographic Society. For his "deep commitment to freedom and a strong national defense", in 1987 he received the Bronze Minuteman, the highest award of the Utah National Guard.

In 1971, in this period of civic involvement, Austad received an honorary doctor of humanities degree from Weber State College, his alma mater. The school would also later honor Austad by naming its largest theater in its fine arts center The Mark Evans Austad Auditorium.

Austad served for two years as chairman of Washington D.C.'s National Cherry Blossom Festival, and in 1973 and 1974 he was chairman of Washington D.C.'s U.S. bicentennial celebration.

Austad served on the presidential inaugural committees both times Richard Nixon was elected. In 1969 Austad chaired the Inaugural Ball committee, and in 1972 he was vice chairman of the inauguration committee. Nixon would appoint Austad to serve as one of the three public members of the United States delegation to the 28th General Assembly of the United Nations. After Nixon's presidential resignation, his successor Gerald Ford appointed Austad as Ambassador to Finland. In 1980 Austad would again serve on an inaugural committee, this time for Ronald Reagan's first election, after which he was again appointed as an ambassador, this time to Norway.

=== Ambassadorships ===
After his service to the Nixon administration and visibility in the Washington, D.C., community, Austad was appointed Ambassador to Finland in 1975. In this role, he was also a delegate to the Helsinki Conference on Security and Cooperation in Europe which brought about the Helsinki Accords. Austad became the first American diplomat to be knighted by Finland, under the Order of the White Rose and Order of the Lion.

In 1981, while living in Wolfeboro, New Hampshire and Scottsdale, Arizona, Austad was appointed Ambassador to Norway by President Ronald Reagan. He served in this position until 1984 and was well received and awarded Norway's highest honor given to foreigners, the Grand Cross of St. Olav's Order, for his work in fighting heart disease. However, he was known for contending with some Norwegians, including the opposition Labor Party, a local Norwegian council, student groups, and a newspaper that frequently ran such headlines as "Austad Strikes Again." He also gained notoriety in the Norwegian media for a 1983 incident in which police were called to a startled woman's home where Austad was loudly banging on the door at 3 a.m. Austad claimed that after hosting an embassy cocktail party, he was on a late-night visit to a friend's house to plan their salmon fishing trip, but his taxi took him to the wrong address. It was alleged that Austad was "apparently under the influence of alcohol" and had spent "half an hour knocking and kicking at her front door Wednesday in an attempt to get in." Police merely dropped Austad back at his hotel, but United States House Democrats listed this incident as one of many ethics violations by Reagan Administration officials. Austad viewed the criticism as inaccurate innuendo and media sensationalism, started by the British newspaper Private Eye and picked up by other papers and wire services. Austad sued Private Eye for libel and they settled for a "substantial sum", for damages and legal expenses, and printed an apology stating their "article constituted a most serious and damaging libel upon Ambassador Austad." Austad dismissed the controversy, saying Norway's largest newspaper, Aftenposten, praised him as the best U.S. ambassador they had ever had.

=== Death ===
Austad died in 1988 at age 71 in Arizona. His funeral was held in Ogden, Utah, and his body was buried in Lindquist Washington Heights Memorial Park.

== Notes ==
Diplomatic posts
Preceded by V. John Krehbiel	United States Ambassador to Finland; 1975–1977	Succeeded by Rozanne L. Ridgway
Preceded by Sidney Anders Rand	United States Ambassador to Norway; 1981–1984	Succeeded by Robert D. Stuart
