= Marc B. Nathanson =

American entrepreneur and diplomat (born 1945)

Marc Nathanson
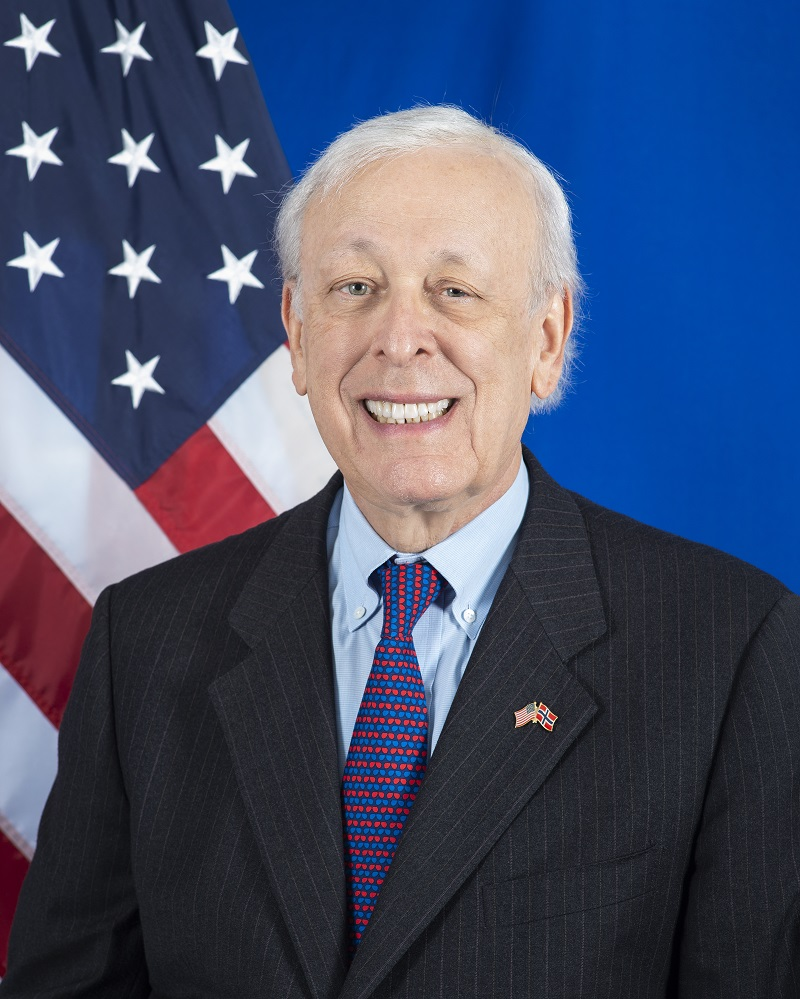
- Official portrait, 2022

32nd United States Ambassador to Norway
- In office June 16, 2022 – February 14, 2024
- President: Joe Biden
- Preceded by: Kenneth Braithwaite
- Succeeded by: Michael E. Kavoukjian

Personal details
- Born: May 12, 1945 (age 81) Los Angeles, California, U.S.
- Spouse: Jane Nathanson (m. 1967)
- Children: 3
- Education: University of Denver (BA); University of California Santa Barbara (MA)
- Occupation: Business Executive
- Known for: Founder of Falcon Cable
- Marc B. Nathanson's voice Nathanson's opening statement at his confirmation hearing before the Senate Foreign Relations Committee to be United States ambassador to Norway; Recorded April 7, 2022

Marc Bennett Nathanson (born May 12, 1945) is an American businessman who was the United States ambassador to Norway from 2022 to 2024. He is best known for his founding of Falcon Cable, which he sold in 1999 for $3.7 billion. He is a member of the Cable TV Hall of Fame, awarded with Inc.s Entrepreneur of the Year and a former chairman of the Broadcasting Board of Governors. In 2024, his net worth was listed as $2.5 billion by Forbes Magazine in their annual The World's Billionaires listing.

== Early life and education ==
Nathanson was born in Los Angeles and raised in Glencoe, Illinois and Highland Park, Illinois. His father, Don Paul "D.P." Nathanson was an investor in the radio and cable industry, operated an advertising agency, and was the publisher of Radio Showmanship, a magazine that focused on how to use radio for advertising. His great uncle was Nathan Nathanson, the founder of Famous Players, a Canadian-based film exhibitor and cable television service provider. Nathanson graduated from Highland Park High School and graduated from the University of Denver in 1967, where he became a brother of Zeta Beta Tau. In 1969, he earned a Master of Arts in political science from the University of California, Santa Barbara.

== Career ==
Nathanson’s first job was as a door-to-door salesman selling cable to people in their homes. In 1969, he took a job with Cypress Communications Corporation (owned by Harriscope Broadcasting) in Los Angeles, California, where he became head of marketing (Cypress was eventually sold to Warner Cable in 1973).

After Cypress Communications, Nathanson became vice-president of marketing and programming for TelePrompTer Corporation. In 1973, he left to start his own firm, Falcon Cable, with a self-investment of $25,000. He received a $2 million investment from his father and father-in-law, and $6 million from a bank loan. The first cable systems he ran were in Gilroy, Porterville. Altadena, and San Luis Obispo, California.

According to the Los Angeles Times, "while many larger cable TV companies have scrambled to wire major metropolitan areas with flashy, 75-channel, state-of-the-art cable TV systems, Falcon has found success in operating no-frills systems in rural areas that get poor TV reception."

The umbrella corporation for the cable company and Nathanson's other ventures was Falcon Holding Group, which Nathanson was president for until 1999. The corporation included Falcon International Communications and Falcon International. He also was the company's CEO from 1975 until its sale in 1999. From 1988 to 1999 he also was CEO and president of Enstar Communications Corp, and chairman of both companies.

The Falcon Group formed in 1984 with Nathanson co-owner of the cable company. According to the Los Angeles Times, the company was formed with other co-owners, including the Mutual Life Insurance of New York, following a $50 million deal for 18 cable systems in seven states that were owned jointly by Warner Communications and American Express. Nathanson was a part of larger mergers between cable entities during the 1990s as well. In 1998 Tele-Communications Inc. took a 47 percent stake in Falcon, and the following year the company was sold to Paul Allen's Charter Communications for $3.7 billion (initial reports pegged the price closer to $3.6 billion). The deal provided Nathanson with the second largest stock holding among the Charter shareholders. According to the St. Louis Business Journal, the deal made "Charter the fourth-largest cable TV operator in the country, with 5.5 million customers." In 1994, he was Inc. Magazine's Entrepreneur of the Year.

Nathanson invested the profits from the sale into his investment firm Mapleton Investments, whose current CEO is Nathanson’s son Adam; which has investments in industries ranging from sports teams to real estate to waterless urinal companies with Falcon Waterfree Technologies, which he first invested with in 2000. Additionally, in 1999 Nathanson bought a home in Aspen, Colorado which is estimated to be worth around $80 million. [3] He is chairman of each firm. Falcon Waterfree Technologies is the largest manufacturer of waterless urinals in the world; and have helped save billions of gallons of freshwater. Now, Mapleton Investments has amassed assets worth over $1 billion alone.

Nathanson became vice-chairman of Charter Communications upon the sale of Falcon and a director of the board, until 2008. He also was director of the National Cable & Telecommunications Association and a trustee of the Aspen Institute. He had also previously been president of the California Cable Television Association, as a designated member of the Cable Pioneers, and founded both the Cable and Telecommunications Association for Marketing (CTAM) and the Southern California Cable Television Association. In addition he is co-chair of the Pacific Council on International Policy, a member of the Council on Foreign Relations, the World Affairs Council, and several charity boards in Southern California. He is also a member of the board of directors for the Los Angeles Philharmonic.

== Politics ==
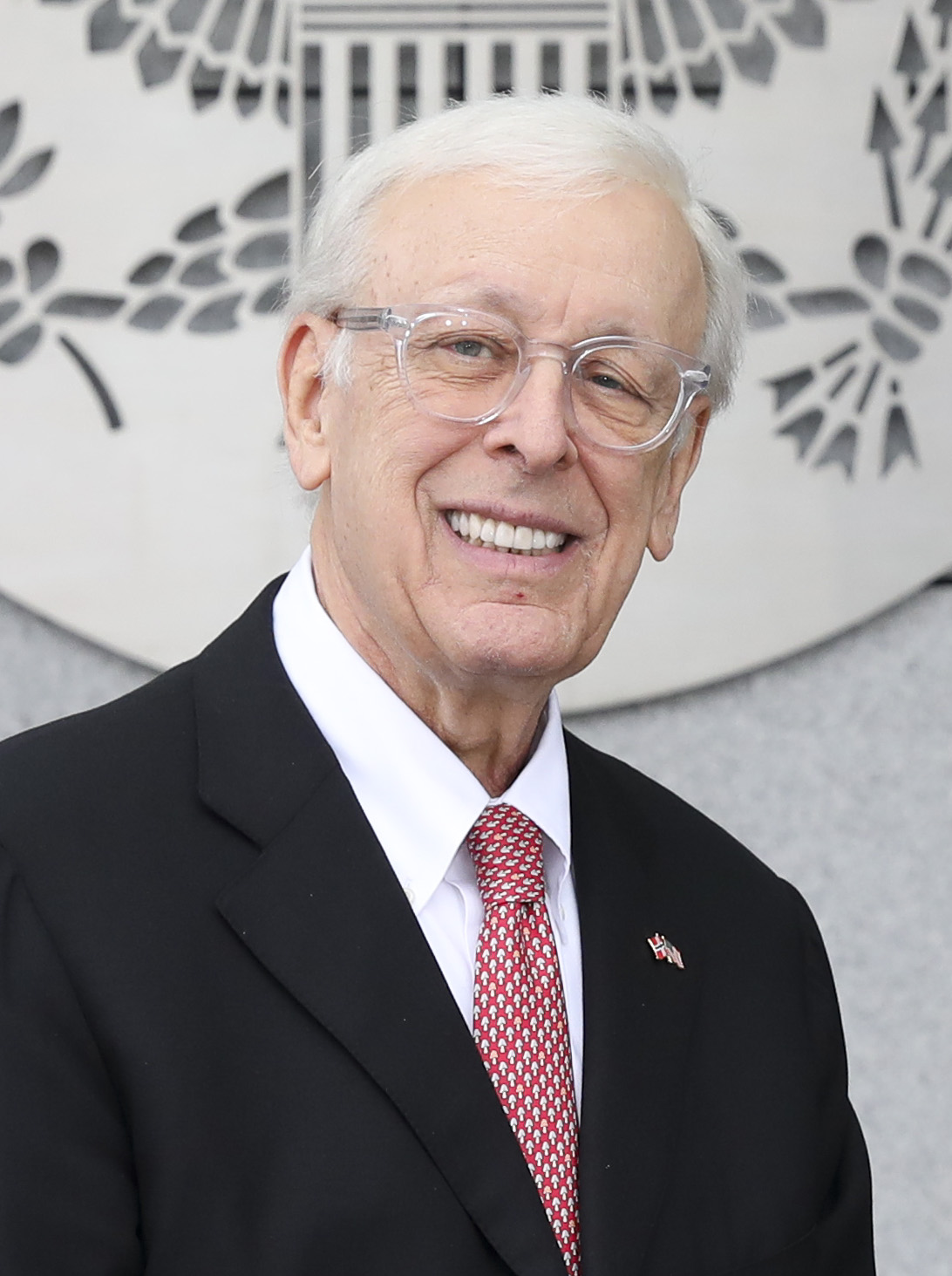
Nathanson in Oslo in February 2023

President Bill Clinton appointed Nathanson to a three-year term on the board of governors of international broadcasting of the United States Information Agency in 1998. He was chairman of the Broadcasting Board of Governors during the Clinton and Bush administrations, is a member of the American Democracy Institute, the U.S. Institute of Peace's International Advisory Council, and the USC Annenberg School for Communication and Journalism. His tenure as chairman of the Broadcasting Board of Governors lasted from 1995 to 2002 and included leading the Broadcasting Board of Governors through its international response to the September 11 attacks.

In 2012, Secretary of State Hillary Clinton named Nathanson as her representative to the board of the East–West Center in Honolulu, Hawaii. He is also the vice-chair of the National Democratic Institute for International Affairs and was founding chair of the Homeland Security Advisory Council for Los Angeles." Nathanson was an early supporter of Barack Obama during his 2008 presidential nomination campaign.

=== Ambassador to Norway ===
On October 29, 2021, President Joe Biden nominated Nathanson to be the US Ambassador to Norway. Hearings on his nomination were held before the Senate Foreign Relations Committee on April 7, 2022. The committee favorably reported his nomination to the Senate floor on May 4, 2022. The entire Senate confirmed Nathanson via voice vote on May 5, 2022. He presented his credentials to King Harald V on June 16, 2022. He resigned in February 2024 in order to work on Biden's reelection campaign.

== Philanthropy ==
Nathanson bequeathed the endowment for the Marc Nathanson Fellowship program at the University of Denver, Nathanson's alma mater; it provides an award to a second-year MA student at the Josef Korbel School of International Studies He also endowed an award known as Nathanson Fellowship at USC.

Nathanson and his wife have collected contemporary art since the 1960s. Together, they have built one of the most prominent art collections in the world, valued at approximately $450 million in a 2015 report. Following a $10 million donation of art to the Los Angeles County Museum of Art, the museum named a gallery for him and his wife. He has also been a trustee for the UCLA Foundation and UCLA Anderson School of Management and USC Annenberg School of Communication. In 2006 they also financed the purchase of a series of prints by Edward Ruscha for LACMA. He has also been a patron and sponsor for exhibitions at the Museum of Contemporary Art, Los Angeles.

The Jane and Marc Nathanson Family Foundation invests charitably and sponsors scientific studies into environmental problems like water shortages and usage efficiency. They are also known for being early supporters of AIDS victims during the early years of the epidemic. At UCLA an endowment produced their namesake Jane and Marc Nathanson Family Professor in Psychiatry chair. In 2002, the couple founded the Nathanson Family Resilience Center at UCLA.

In January 2015, LACMA received eight pieces of modern and contemporary art from Nathanson and his wife, Jane (who is also a LACMA trustee and a founder and trustee of the Museum of Contemporary Art, Los Angeles); the gift was estimated at over $50 million. The works include Andy Warhol's Two Marilyns silkscreen, James Rosenquist's Portrait of the Scull Family, George Segal's Laundromat, Gilbert and George's Falling, Frank Stella's La Columba Ladra, Julian Schnabel's Fox Farm Painting X, Roy Lichtenstein's Interior with Three Hanging Lamps, Damien Hirst's And Death Will Have His Day and 10 gelatin silver prints.

== Recognition ==
Nathanson is a member of the Cable TV Hall of Fame and in 1994 he was Inc. Magazine's Entrepreneur of the Year.

In 2009, Nathanson received the Global Green Millennium Award for his efforts in water conservation. "Nathanson is a recipient of Global Green's Millennium Award and the Environmental Media Association's Lifetime Achievement Award for his environmental work."

In October 2011, Nathanson was honored at the 21st annual Environmental Media Awards.

In June 2024, Nathanson gave the University of Denver commencement speech where over 12,000 graduates and family attended.

In June 2026, Nathanson is set to deliver the commencement address for the Graduate Division at the University of California, Santa Barbara. Nathanson will speak to Honors Students and give advice about his career, as well as about his time as a young businessman at UCSB in 1969.

== Personal life ==
In 1967, Nathanson married Jane Fallek, a psychologist and philanthropist, whom he met in college. They have two sons, Adam and David, and a daughter, Nicole. Adam is married to Lauren Waisbren in 2010 and is the CEO of real estate company Mapleton Investments. They also have a son, Henry. David is head of business development for Fox Sports and is married to Sabina Spigel. They had a daughter Nina in 2010.

Diplomatic posts
Preceded by Kenneth Braithwaite	United States Ambassador to Norway; 2022–2024	Succeeded by Sharon Hudson-Dean (Acting)
