= Samuel D. Heins =

American lawyer (born 1947)

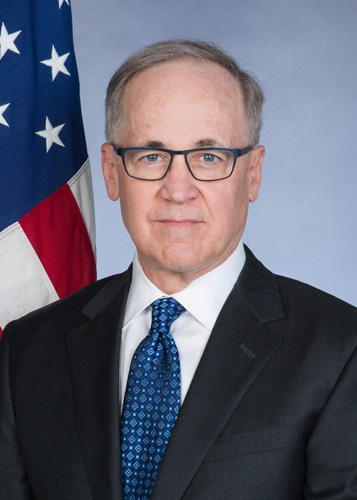

United States Ambassador to Norway
- In office March 10, 2016 – January 12, 2017
- President: Barack Obama
- Preceded by: Julie Furuta-Toy (Acting)
- Succeeded by: Kenneth Braithwaite

Personal details
- Born: May 31, 1947 (age 79)
- Education: University of Minnesota Law School

Samuel D. Heins (born May 31, 1947) is the former United States Ambassador to Norway, serving from 2016 to 2017. The wait for confirmation of a new ambassador by the United States Senate led to the Embassy being without a Senate-confirmed Ambassador for 29 months. He succeeded Barry B. White, who had resigned the position in 2013.

== Foreign Service ==
He was confirmed by the Senate on February 12, 2016, and presented his credentials to Harald V of Norway on March 10, 2016.

His long-awaited arrival was announced enthusiastically by Foreign Minister Børge Brende on Twitter, which is unusual for Ambassadorial appointments to Norway. His appointment followed the failed nomination of George James Tsunis.

Before his appointment, Ambassador Heins was most recently a partner in the Heins, Mills and Olson Law Firm in Minneapolis. He earned a B.A. degree from the University of Minnesota in 1968 and a J.D. degree from the University of Minnesota Law School in 1972. His spouse is also a retired lawyer. They have three children. He is the fifth U.S. Ambassador to Norway from Minnesota.

== See also ==
- List of ambassadors of the United States

Diplomatic posts
Preceded by Julie Furuta-Toy	United States Ambassador to Norway; 2016–2017	Succeeded by Kenneth Braithwaite
