= Clifton Reginald Wharton Sr. =

American diplomat (1899–1990)

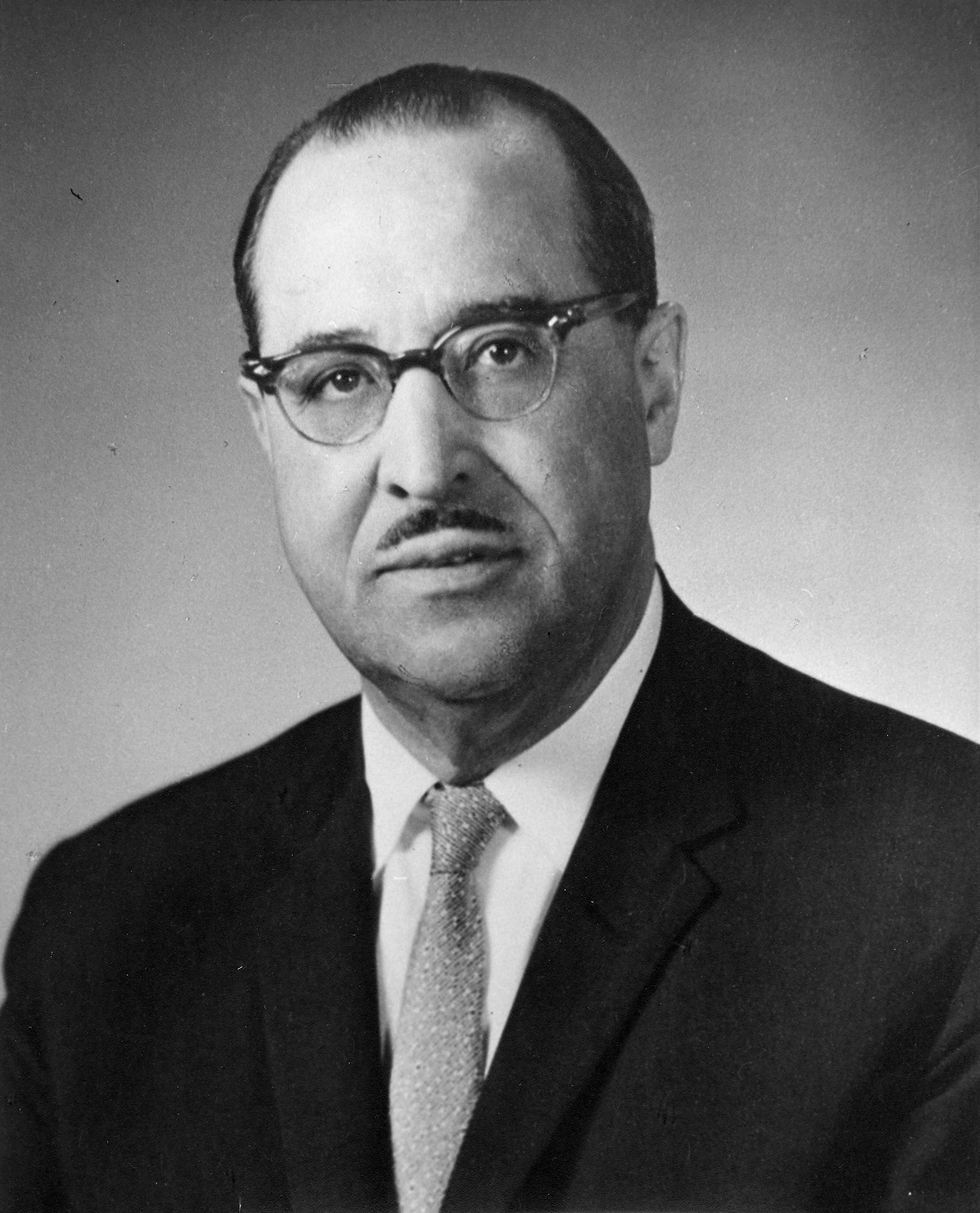
- Wharton c. 1961–1964

6th United States Ambassador to Norway
- In office March 2, 1961 – September 4, 1964
- President: John F. Kennedy; Lyndon B. Johnson
- Preceded by: Frances E. Willis
- Succeeded by: Margaret Joy Tibbetts

22nd United States Minister to Romania
- In office March 7, 1958 – October 21, 1960
- President: Dwight D. Eisenhower
- Preceded by: Robert H. Thayer
- Succeeded by: William A. Crawford

Personal details
- Born: Clifton Reginald Wharton; May 11, 1899 Baltimore, Maryland, U.S.
- Died: April 25, 1990 (aged 90) Phoenix, Arizona, U.S.
- Spouse: Harriet Banks
- Children: 4, including Clifton Jr.
- Education: Boston University School of Law (LL.M.)
- Profession: Career Diplomat

Clifton Reginald Wharton Sr. (May 11, 1899 – April 25, 1990) was an American diplomat, and the first African American diplomat to become an ambassador by rising through the ranks of the Foreign Service rather than by political appointment such as Frederick Douglass. He also became the first Black Foreign Service Officer to become chief of a diplomatic mission.

== Personal life ==
He married Harriet Banks; they had four children. His son Clifton Reginald Wharton Jr. is a noted economist and executive who also served in the State Department as Deputy Secretary of State during the Clinton administration, and before that as president of Michigan State University.

Wharton was a member of Alpha Phi Alpha fraternity.

== Career ==
Born in Baltimore to William Bowman Wharton and Rosalind Griffin, Wharton received his law degree in 1920 and an advanced law degree in 1923 from Boston University School of Law. He practiced in Boston before joining the U.S. State Department as a law clerk in August 1924. He was the only Black professional in the Department at the time. He was left alone by his coworkers; he only had lunch with a coworker once during this period. He took the Foreign Service examination the first time it was given and received high marks on the written tests. Wharton was appointed to the Foreign Service on March 20, 1925 and was the first Black Foreign Service Officer. Wharton went on to be Vice Consul in Monrovia (1927–1929), Consul in Las Palmas (1932–1938), Minister to Romania (1958–1961) and Ambassador to Norway (1961–1964).

Unlike the other new Foreign Service officers, Wharton was immediately sent to post in Monrovia upon appointment as opposed to attending the Foreign Service Institute for training. He was originally supposed to go on a cargo ship with only two cabins. After refusing to go, the Department then arranged for transportation via a White Star-Cunard ocean liner. The Department claimed it was due to an urgent need in Liberia, but many Black newspapers were skeptical. Wharton was unsurprised to be sent to Monrovia, as it was a post in the "Negro Circuit", a string of posts in Africa and the Caribbean where almost all Black officers were sent where the native populations were largely Black and the positions were generally undesirable. On the subject of the Negro Circuit, Wharton told the Department of State's Personnel Office, "You're not only discriminating against us [Black employees] in the Service, but you're also exporting discrimination abroad in the Foreign Service."

After five years in Liberia, Wharton was assigned to go to Calais but the officer he was set to replace refused to leave so Wharton was reassigned to the French overseas department of Martinique. He requested a post with better weather and was redirected to Las Palmas in the Canary Islands. Wharton was the first Black officer in Las Palmas but soon after, other Black officers began to be assigned there.

From 1930 to 1942, Wharton returned to Liberia for assignments many times. He also worked in Tananarive, Madagascar, Oporto and Ponta Delgada, quintessential posts in the Negro Circuit. Finally in 1949, Wharton was transferred away from this pattern as consul general and first secretary at Lisbon's American Embassy, before becoming supervisory consul general over Portugal and its islands. His transfer to Lisbon came months after his transfer request as personnel officials were resistant to sending a Black officer to Europe. When his transfer was finally accepted, it was as first secretary and consul instead of consul general, the position he qualified for based on experience. He was finally made consul general a year after his initial transfer. Wharton was the first Black officer in Lisbon as well as the first Black senior officer. In 1953, Wharton was appointed consul general in Marseille, again as the first Black person to hold that position.

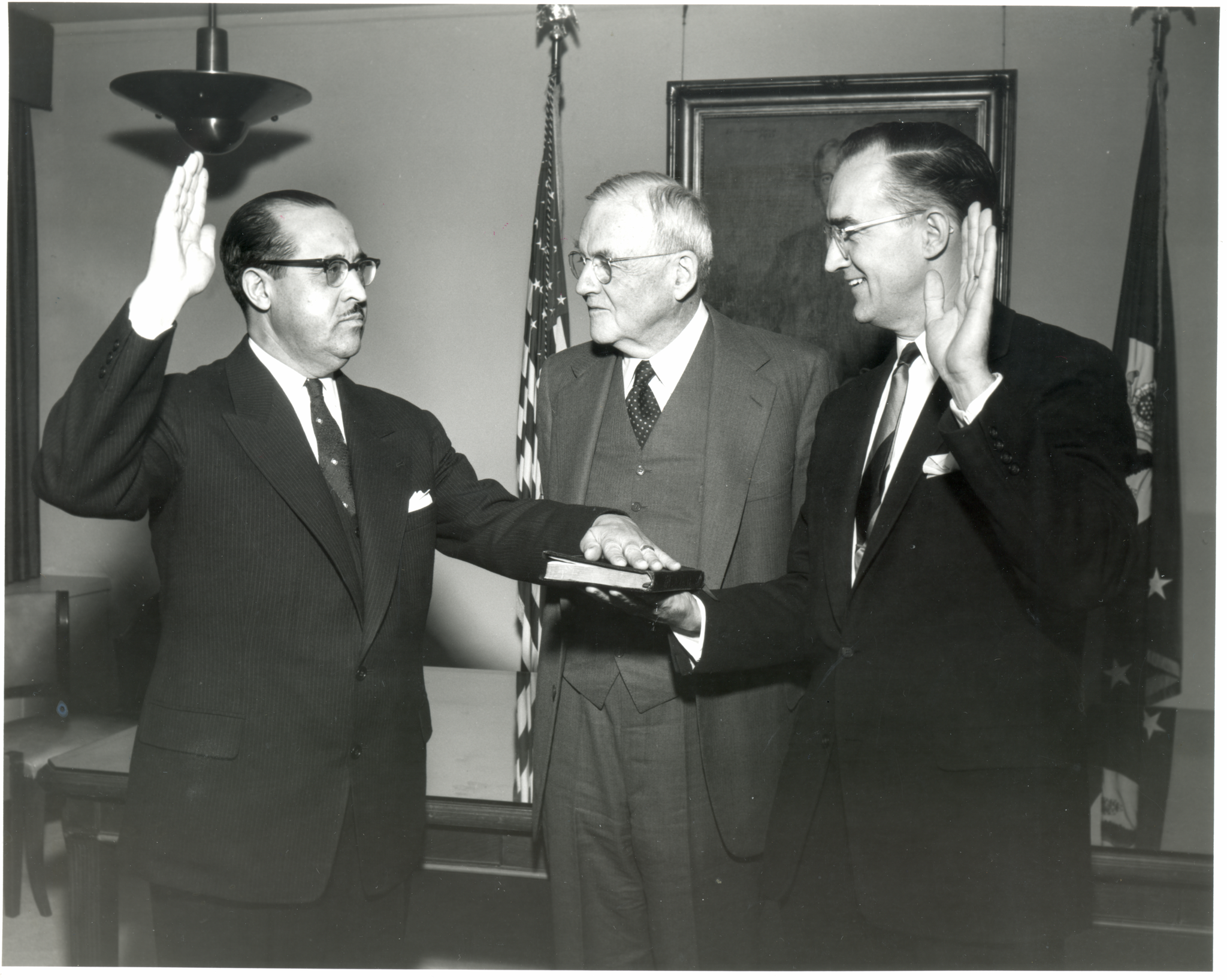
Clifton R. Wharton Sr. being sworn in as Ambassador to Romania, February 1958

In 1958, President Eisenhower offered Wharton the position of U.S. Envoy to Romania. He originally refused the position, suspecting that it was being extended due to his race. After he was assured this was not the case, Wharton accepted the position and became the first Black officer to head a U.S. delegation in Europe. Loy Henderson, Deputy Undersecretary for Administration wrote to Wharton later

One of the most unforgettable moments of my Foreign Service life was my conversation with you when you flew from Marseilles to Washington in order to make sure that your appointment as minister to Romania was based on merit and qualifications—not on racial considerations. You made it clear to me that if the matter of race had been one of the criteria, you would not be able to accept the appointment. I was deeply touched and glad to tell you that race had not been a factor.

In 1961, Wharton was appointed by President Kennedy as U.S. Ambassador to Norway. He was the first Black ambassador to come up through the Foreign Service, not as a political appointee. He also jointly served as a delegate to NATO and the UN that same year.

Wharton retired on October 24, 1964. At his retirement, Secretary of State Dean Rusk wrote, "Yours has been an outstanding career and I am sure you take pride in the fine reputation you have earned."

Wharton died in Phoenix, Arizona.

== Legacy ==
In 1978, the State Department had a day honoring Wharton and diplomat Lucile Atcherson Curtis, who was the first woman in what became the U.S. Foreign Service.

On May 30, 2006, the United States Postal Service issued a stamp depicting Wharton in its Distinguished American Diplomats commemorative series.

== See also ==
- Rogers Act

Diplomatic posts
Preceded by Frances E. Willis	United States Ambassador to Norway; 1961–1964	Succeeded by Margaret Joy Tibbetts
