= Eldred, Minnesota =

Eldred
- Unincorporated community
- Location within Minnesota Location within the United States
- Coordinates: 47°40′58″N 96°46′49″W
- Country: United States
- State: Minnesota
- County: Polk
- Elevation: 866 ft (264 m)
- Time zone: UTC-6 (Central (CST))
  - Summer (DST): UTC-5 (CDT)
- Area code: 218
- GNIS feature ID: 643235

Eldred is an unincorporated community in Polk County, in the U.S. state of Minnesota.

== History ==
A post office called Eldred was established in 1897, and remained in operation until 1968. According to Warren Upham, the community may be named for Nathaniel B. Eldred, a Pennsylvania judge.
