= Clifton R. Wharton Jr. =

American academic and diplomat (1926–2024)

Clifton Reginald Wharton Jr.
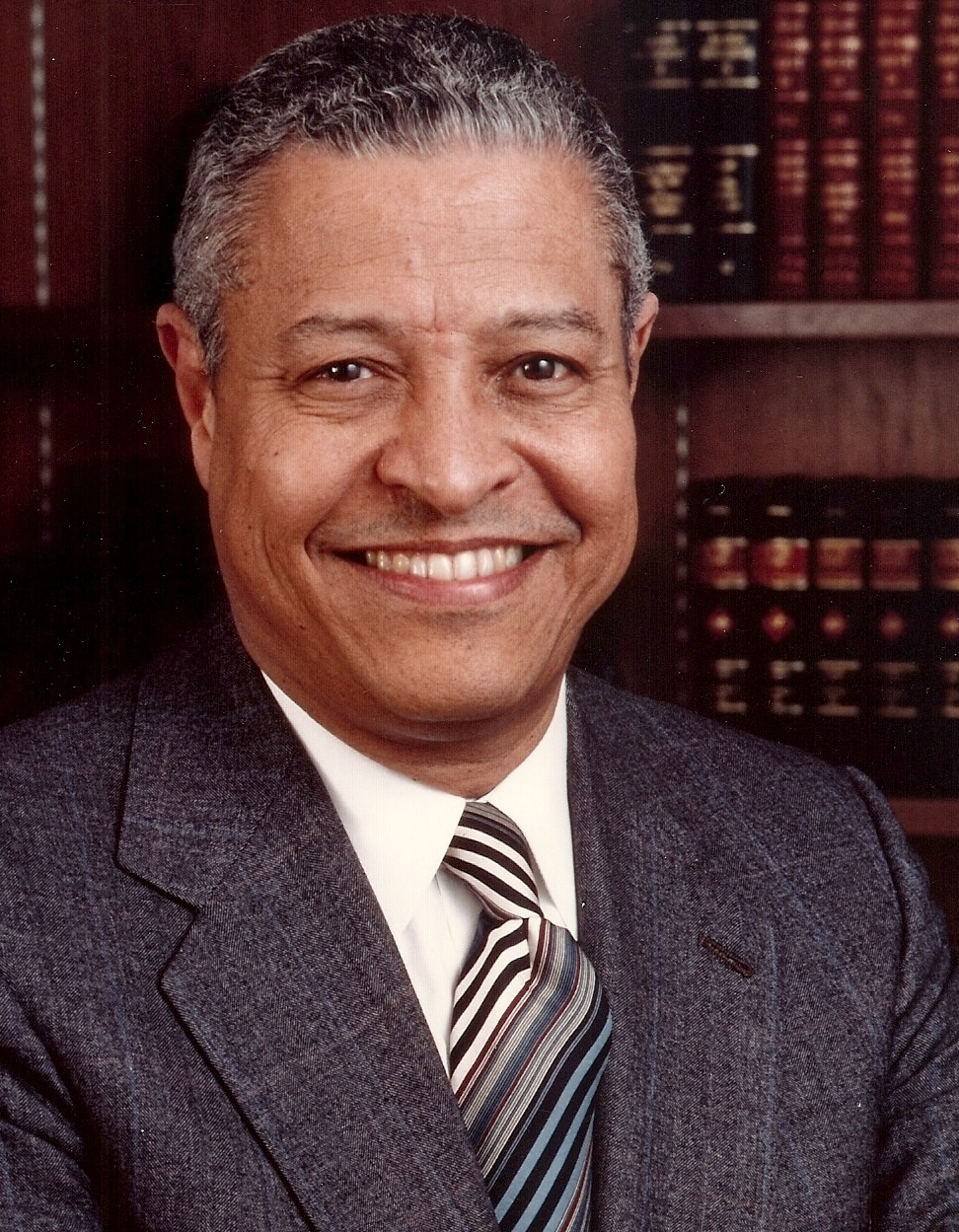
- Wharton in 1987

11th United States Deputy Secretary of State
- In office January 27, 1993 – November 8, 1993
- President: Bill Clinton
- Preceded by: Lawrence Eagleburger
- Succeeded by: Strobe Talbott

Personal details
- Born: Clifton Reginald Wharton Jr. September 13, 1926 Boston, Massachusetts, U.S.
- Died: November 16, 2024 (aged 98) New York City, U.S.
- Spouse: Dolores Duncan (m. 1950)
- Children: 2
- Parent: Clifton Reginald Wharton Sr. (father)

Clifton Reginald Wharton Jr. (September 13, 1926 – November 16, 2024) was an American university president, corporate executive, and United States deputy secretary of state.

== Early life and career ==
Born in Boston, his father Clifton Reginald Wharton Sr. was a 40-year Foreign Service officer and the first African-American to pass the Foreign Service exam and to become a career ambassador. He graduated from Boston Latin School and entered Harvard College at 16. While there, he was national secretary and a founding member of the U.S. National Students Association. He was the first African American to earn a Master of Arts degree in international affairs from the Paul H. Nitze School of Advanced International Studies of Johns Hopkins University and later graduated from University of Chicago with a master of arts and a Ph.D. in economics. His doctoral advisor was later Nobel laureate Theodore Schultz.

Reporters and profiles have regularly described Wharton "Such has been the life of Clifton Wharton, whose career in higher education and business, foreign economic development, and philanthropy has included so many firsts – often without much fanfare—that he is sometimes called "the quiet pioneer." In the course of his career, Wharton had become a black member of the establishment rather than a member of the black establishment.

Wharton's first 22-year philanthropic career began in Latin America with Nelson Rockefeller. Subsequently, he was resident in Southeast Asia from 1958 to 1964 representing a foundation headed by John D. Rockefeller 3rd. During this period he also supervised the foundation's programs in Thailand, Vietnam, Laos and Cambodia, as well as taught economics at the University of Malaya. Many of his students and grantees became leaders in the region. His research ranged from the supply response of Southeast Asian perennial crops and international trade to the economics of subsistence agriculture and the impact of the Green Revolution. He was a member of the Presidential Mission to Vietnam in 1966 and of the Rockefeller presidential mission to Latin America in 1969. Wharton was appointed chairman of the Board for International Food and Agricultural Development at USAID by President Gerald Ford, where he served for eight years (1976–83) and was succeeded by E. T. York. He was also co-Chairman of the Commission on Security and Economic Assistance, U.S. Department of State (1983), and member of the Presidential Advisory Committee on Trade Policy (1991–92). Wharton has published articles in numerous professional journals and is the author of Subsistence Agriculture and Economic Development (Aldine Press 1969) and co-author with Theodore M. Hesburgh and Paul A. Miller of Patterns for Lifelong Learning (Jossey-Bass 1973). In February 1969 he was elected to the board of Equitable Life, becoming the second black corporate director in the U.S. He later became a director of eight other U.S. corporations.

On October 17, 1969, Wharton was elected president of Michigan State University. The New York Times inaccurately reported: "Negro Pacesetter – Clifton Wharton has done it again. As the newly appointed president of Michigan State University, Dr. Wharton will be the first Negro president of a major predominantly white college in the country." In fact, Patrick Francis Healy, president of Georgetown University from 1873-1882, was the first African-American president of a major predominately white American university. However, Healy's racial background was not widely known during Healy's lifetime. Wharton's term of office, from 1970 to 1978, was often a turbulent one, featuring student demonstrations in 1970 and 1972. His major achievements were his successful efforts to maintain the quality of MSU's academic programs despite budget reductions, his commitment to the education of the economically and educationally disadvantaged, and the integration of the Michigan State University College of Osteopathic Medicine with the other medical schools. Major innovations implemented under Wharton's tenure included the Presidential Commission on Admissions and Student Body Composition to study future enrollment policies and a Presidential Fellows Program to allow selected students and junior faculty members to gain experience in university administration. Wharton's most lasting contribution to the university was the completion of a new center for the performing arts. The building, dedicated in 1982, was named in honor of Wharton and his wife Dolores, in recognition of the strong support, which they gave the project. The university's Wharton Center for Performing Arts is named for him and for his wife, Dolores.

In 1978, he became chancellor (president) of the 64-campus State University of New York system. Again he was identified as the first African-American to head the largest university system in the nation. During his nine-year tenure, he achieved greater management flexibility for the university, strengthened the university's research capability, and dramatically improved the quality image of the university. SUNY Chairman Donald M. Blinken stated that Wharton's most enduring achievement was the Independent Commission and the flexibility legislation.

In 1982 he was named chairman of the Rockefeller Foundation succeeding Father Theodore Hesburgh and served as a trustee for 17 years. In 1987 he became CEO of TIAA-CREF, the giant pension and financial services company, making him first Black chairman and CEO of a major U.S. corporation. A cartoon on the cover of the March 27, 1988 New York Times, showed Wharton walking a tightrope across the chasm of Wall Street while carrying a safe whose contents of currency were spilling out. The unspoken question was whether he would successfully reach the other side safely without losing all the pension assets.

Wharton's performance in turning around this corporation was highlighted by Professor Michael Useem, director of the Center for Leadership and Change Management at the Wharton School, University of Pennsylvania (unrelated), as an exemplary example of corporate leadership. "Wharton had lived up to his reputation as a crisis manager. In the course of only nine months, he had initiated dramatic changes in the structure and methods of the venerable pension fund." Robert Atwell, president of the American Council on Education, characterized Wharton's impact, "In no time at all, with dizzying speed turned all that around...I have probably never seen a more spectacular performance." Among Wharton's former corporate directorships are Ford Motor Company, Time-Warner, Equitable Life, Tenneco Inc., Federated Department Stores, Public Broadcasting Service (PBS), New York Stock Exchange, Harcourt General, TIAA-CREF, and vice chairman of the Federal Reserve Bank of New York. Wharton has served six presidents in foreign policy advisory posts.

Wharton served as deputy secretary of state (the number-two position in the department) from January 27 to November 8, 1993, under President Bill Clinton. Wharton's portfolio included the reorganization of the State Department, the foreign aid budget and the restructuring of the Agency for International Development, but he was not directly involved in the formulation of the policies that ran into trouble at State. Nevertheless, he was forced to resign after Secretary Warren Christopher leaked rumors of his disappointment with Wharton's performance on the job. Editorials and op-eds commented that Wharton was unfairly cast as a scapegoat for the failures of Clinton's foreign policies since Wharton had not been involved in foreign policy.

Wharton was a member and co-chairman of the Knight Commission on Intercollegiate Athletics, and was a trustee of the Clark Foundation, Bassett Hospital, and the American Assembly. He served as chairman of the National Association of State Universities and Land Grant Colleges, 1981–82, and received the President's Award on World Hunger in 1983. In 1994 he received the American Council on Education Distinguished Service Award for Lifetime Achievement, and in 2005 the John Hope Franklin Award. In 2015 his name was placed on the frieze of Boston Latin School's Assembly Hall.

== Personal life and death ==
His wife, Dolores, has had her own career as a corporate director, foundation executive, and arts advocate. She retired as the chairman and chief executive officer of The Fund for Corporate Initiatives, Inc., a non-profit organization which she founded to strengthen the role of minorities and women in the corporate world. Among her former corporate directorships are Phillips Petroleum, Kellogg Co., and Gannett (media) on each she was the first woman and first black director. Her other prior boards include COMSAT, Michigan Bell Telephone, NY Telephone, and Capital Bank and Trust (Albany, New York). In the area of the arts, Wharton was appointed by President Ford to the National Council on the Arts of the National Endowment for the Arts (1974–1980). She was appointed by Governor Milliken to the Michigan Council for the Arts (1971–1975). She also was a trustee of the Museum of Modern Art (1977–1987), the Detroit Institute of the Arts, and the Albany Institute of History and Art (1980–1987). During her residency in Southeast Asia (1958–64), she conducted a survey of the artists of Malaysia which was published in 1972 as a book, "Contemporary Artists of Malaysia: A Biographic Survey", by the Asia Society of New York.

Dolores Wharton was formerly a member of the board of governors of the Massachusetts Institute of Technology (1987–1994) and has been a trustee of such organizations as the Asia Society, the Aspen Institute, Albany Law School, and the Fashion Institute of Technology. Mrs. Wharton holds a B.A. degree in fine arts from Chicago State University and nine honorary Doctors of Humane Letters.

Wharton received 63 honorary doctorates. Wharton's Harvard University honorary degree of 1992 citation read, "One of the commanding leaders of our time, yours is the great talent to transform organizations into communities of purpose working devotedly together to serve the common good of all people from all backgrounds." His autobiography, Privilege and Prejudice: The Life of a Black Pioneer, was published in August 2015 by Michigan State University Press. Wharton died from cancer in Manhattan, New York, on November 16, 2024, at the age of 98.

Academic offices
Preceded by Walter Adams	President of Michigan State University; 1970–1978	Succeeded by Edgar L. Harden
Preceded by Ernest L. Boyer	Chancellor of the State University of New York; January 25, 1978 – January 31, 1987	Succeeded by Jerome B. Komisar (Acting)
Non-profit organization positions
Preceded by Theodore Hesburgh	Chairman of the Rockefeller Foundation; 1982–1987	Succeeded by John Robert Evans
Business positions
Preceded by	Chairman and CEO of TIAA-CREF; February 1987 – January 1993	Succeeded by John H. Biggs
Political offices
Preceded by Lawrence S. Eagleburger	U.S. Deputy Secretary of State; January 27, 1993 – November 8, 1993	Succeeded by Strobe Talbott
