= Argenteuil (Manet) =

1874 painting by Édouard Manet

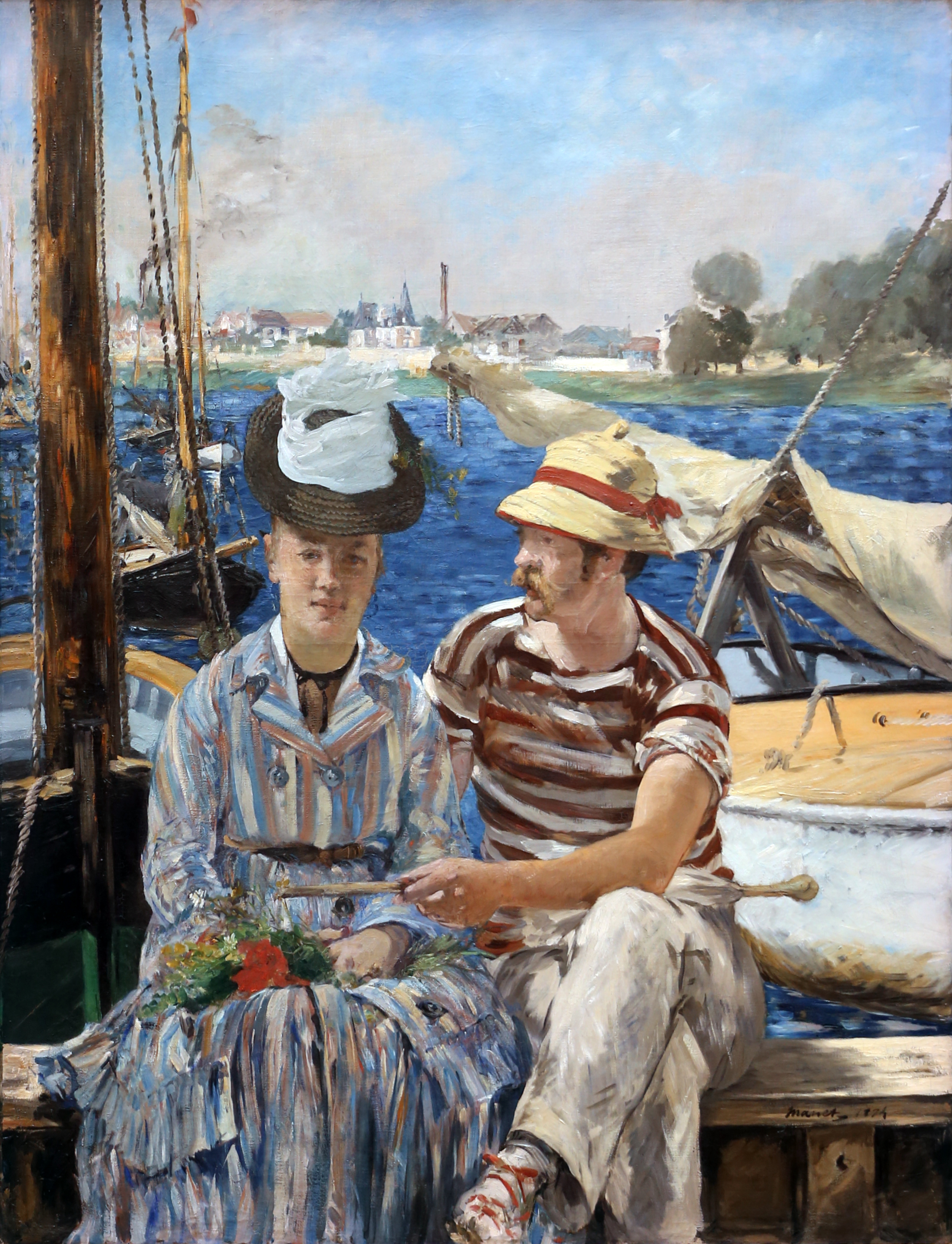
- Artist: Édouard Manet
- Year: 1874
- Medium: Oil on canvas
- Dimensions: 148.5 cm × 114.5 cm (58.5 in × 45.1 in)
- Location: Musée des Beaux-Arts, Tournai

Argenteuil is an 1874 oil on canvas painting by Édouard Manet (1832–1883), first exhibited at the Paris Salon of 1875. It is one of Manet's first works to be regarded as a fully Impressionist painting due to its naturalistic style and its bold palette. The painting depicts a sailor and his companion sitting on a mooring dock surrounded by sailboats, the deep blue water of the Seine, and the town of Argenteuil on the far bank. Art historians have described Argenteuil as a response to Claude Monet's depiction of similar subject matter.

Manet held the painting until his death. After his death, Henri Van Cutsem purchased it from Manet's widow, Suzzane Manet. Van Cutsem eventually bequeathed his collection to the city of Tournai, Belgium where the painting currently resides in the Musée des beaux-arts.

== Context ==
From 1872 onwards, Manet's themes and brighter palette echoed those of Claude Monet and Auguste Renoir. He spent the summer of 1874 in Gennevilliers and took the chance to visit his friend Monet, who had lived at Argenteuil since 1873. The surrounding villages beside the Seine were then full of Impressionist painters; in addition to Manet and Monet, Renoir frequently travelled there and Gustave Caillebotte was based at Petit-Gennevilliers. The works by Manet from this time that were associated with Monet include The Monet Family in their Garden (1874, New York, Metropolitan Museum of Art) and Claude Monet Painting in his Studio (1874, Munich, Neue Pinakothek).

Despite close physical proximity to the other Impressionists, Manet managed to distinguish himself through Argenteuil. While the others elected to host the First Impressionist Exhibition to display their art in 1874, Manet decided to display Argenteuil at the more traditional Paris Salon, opening Impressionism to a broader audience. Even then, Manet was viewed as the leader of the Impressionists, who were referred to as "la bande á Manet" before adopting the Impressionist title.

== Analysis ==
The work depicts a boatman and his companion sitting on a mooring dock surrounded by sailboats, the deep blue water of the Seine, and the town of Argenteuil on the far bank. Manet's brother-in-law Rodolph Leenhoff posed for the figure of the man, who has an expression of intimacy in the painting; the woman, whose identity is unknown, appears less expressive, which the art historian Françoise Cachin attributes to the difficulty of posing for Manet. The composition involves a series of verticals made up of the mast, the woman, and the factory chimney and horizontals made up of the parapet, rolled parasol held by the man, and the bank. Manet punctuated their appearance with small patches of color such as the white on the woman's hat, the flowers held by the woman, and the red band on the man's head. In Argenteuil, Cachin says, Manet masterfully displays "the lively, dazzling style" of the Impressionists while remaining "deliberate, composed."

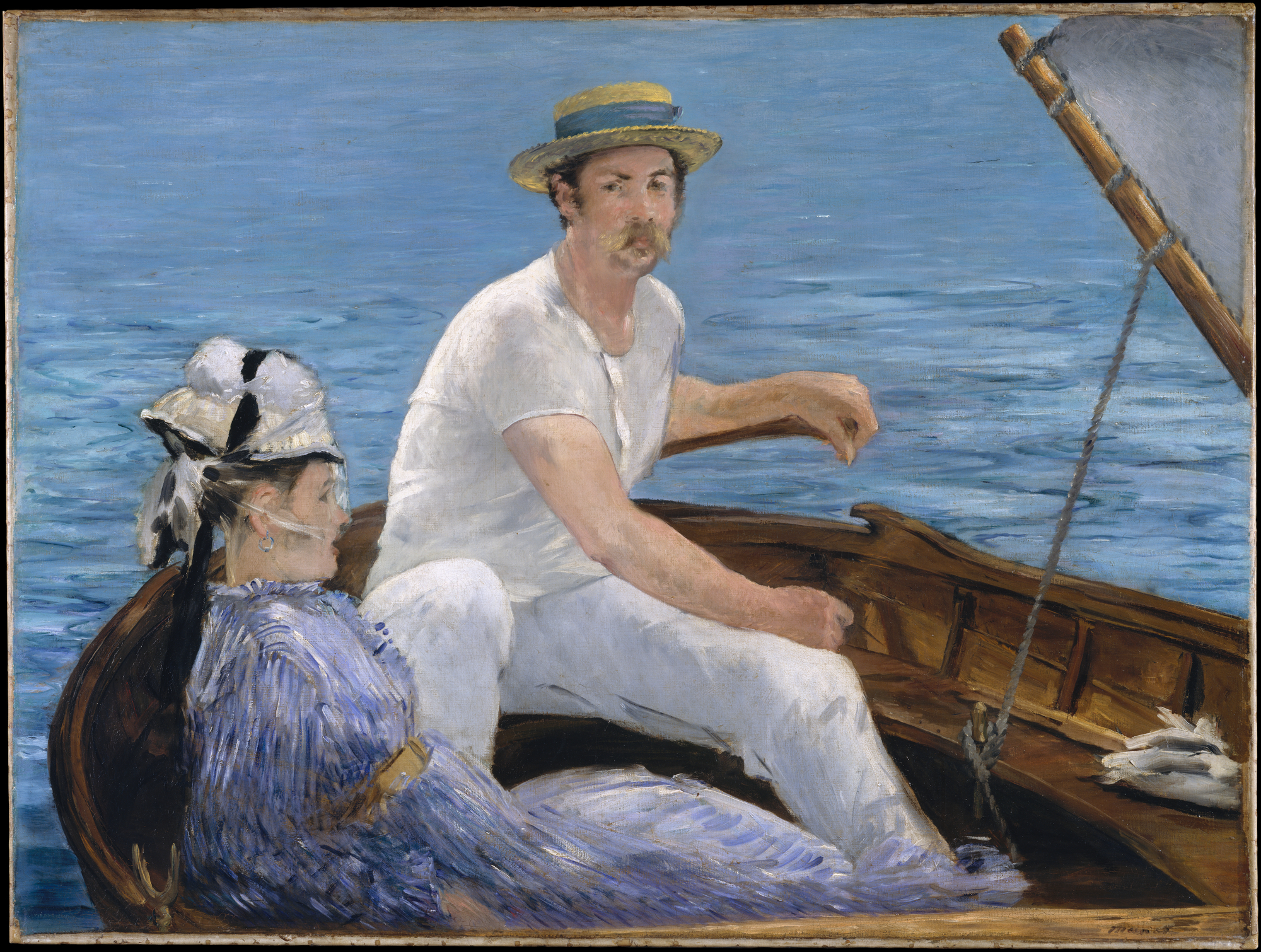
Boating (1874) by Édouard Manet

Carol Armstrong elaborates on the relationship between the man and woman describing it as an "anecdotal meeting of the sexes." She suggests that the encounter is sexual in nature judging from the line of the man's gaze and the positioning of his cane. Furthermore, she notices paired alternatives in the man and woman, expressed through a series of binary oppositions: "front/profile, vertical/horizontal, formal/casual, artificial/natural, fashioned/spontaneous, feminine/masculine." She believes that between these pairs, the painting leans toward those which fall "under the sign of the feminine." Finally, Armstrong argues that Argenteuil, while feminine, faces its masculine counterpart in Manet's painting, Boating. She suggests that Boating, while containing the same man and woman, "reverses many of the oppositions of Argenteuil...the woman is seen in profile and the man from the front, her hat is lumpen...while his is stiff-brimmed and more precisely painted."

T.J. Clark analyzes the painting as an exploration of the middle class, the countryside, and industry. He describes "the great, flat clarity of form" of Argenteuil with the elements coexisting through calculated touch and brushstrokes. In particular, Clark emphasizes the flatness of the work with the woman's hat providing the strongest example. He describes it as "a black straw oval" with the white tulle acting as a metaphor to "put in doubt the picture's already fragile space" thus lapping "like a wave against the far white wall." Clark also notes the apparent reflection of the chimney on the water which, on closer inspection, is actually caused by rope hanging from a boat's boom. Clark describes it as a "kind of joke" about false equivalence and things that seem to connect but in fact, do not. Finally, Clark connects the landscape in the background with the figures. He states that the "figures and the landscape do not quite belong together" in the sense that it does not appear natural. Clark says that Argenteuil "was the look of a new form of life—a placid form, a modest form, but one with a claim to pleasure" enticing the viewer to observe the painting in a new light.

== Critical reaction ==
When Argenteuil was first displayed at the Salon, it received negative responses, often emphasizing the color of the water. Maurice Chaumelin wrote in 1877 in Le Bien Public, "[Manet] shows us a butcher's boy, with ruddy arms and pug nose, out boating on a river of indigo...decked out in horrible finery, and looking horribly sullen." Rousseau described the work as "Marmalade from Argenteuil spread on an indigo river. The master returns as a twentieth-year student." Gaillardon wrote, "It is all too obvious that Canontiers d'Argenteuil is a disaster."

A few critics came to Manet's defense, however. Chesneau counters the complaint about the color of the water saying, "[Manet] paints water blue. That is the great complaint. However, if the water is blue on certain days...must he paint it the traditional green color of water?...They hiss, I applaud." Additionally, Castagnary recognized Argenteuil's merits writing, "What Manet paints is contemporary life."

== Gallery ==
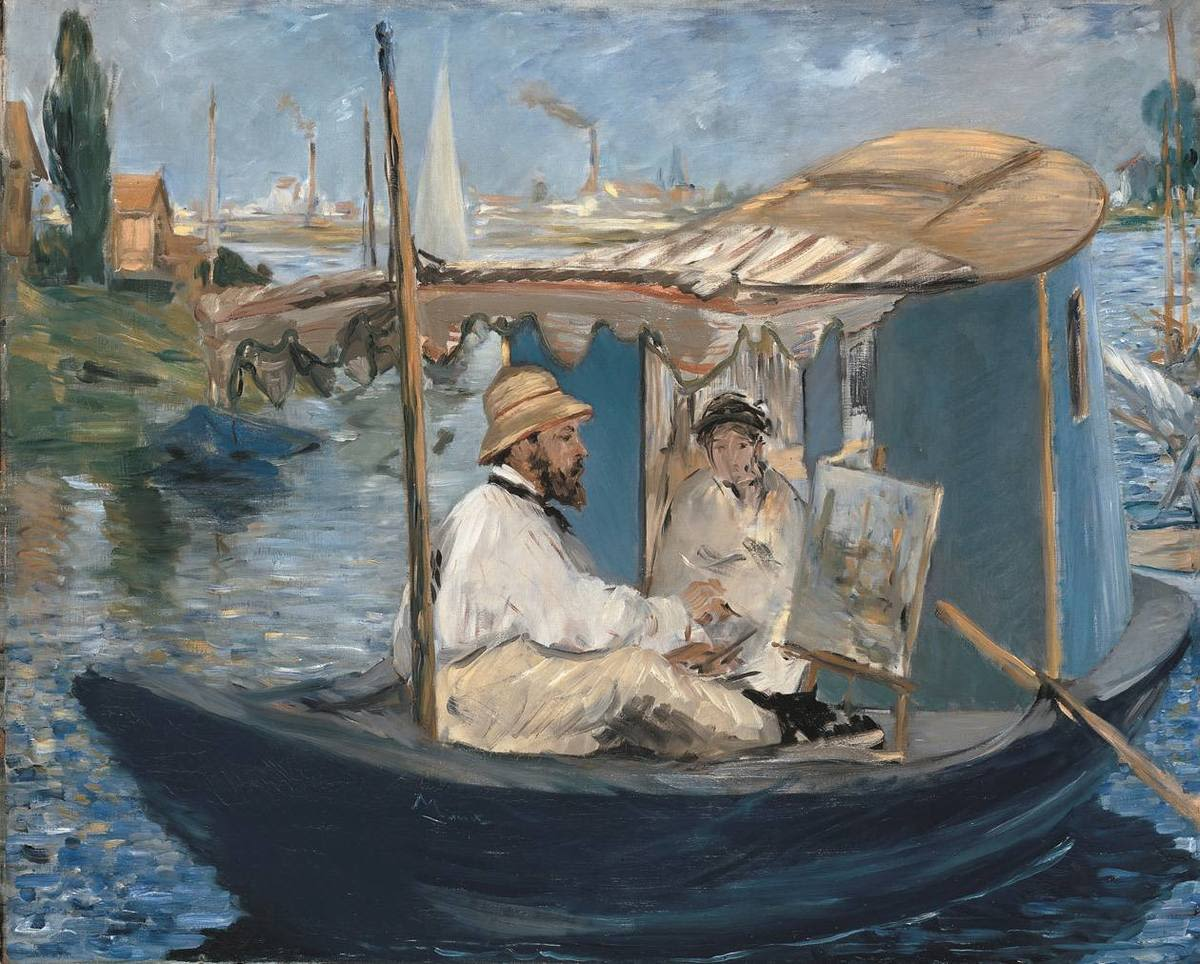
Claude Monet Painting in his Studio, 1874, Munich, Neue Pinakothek

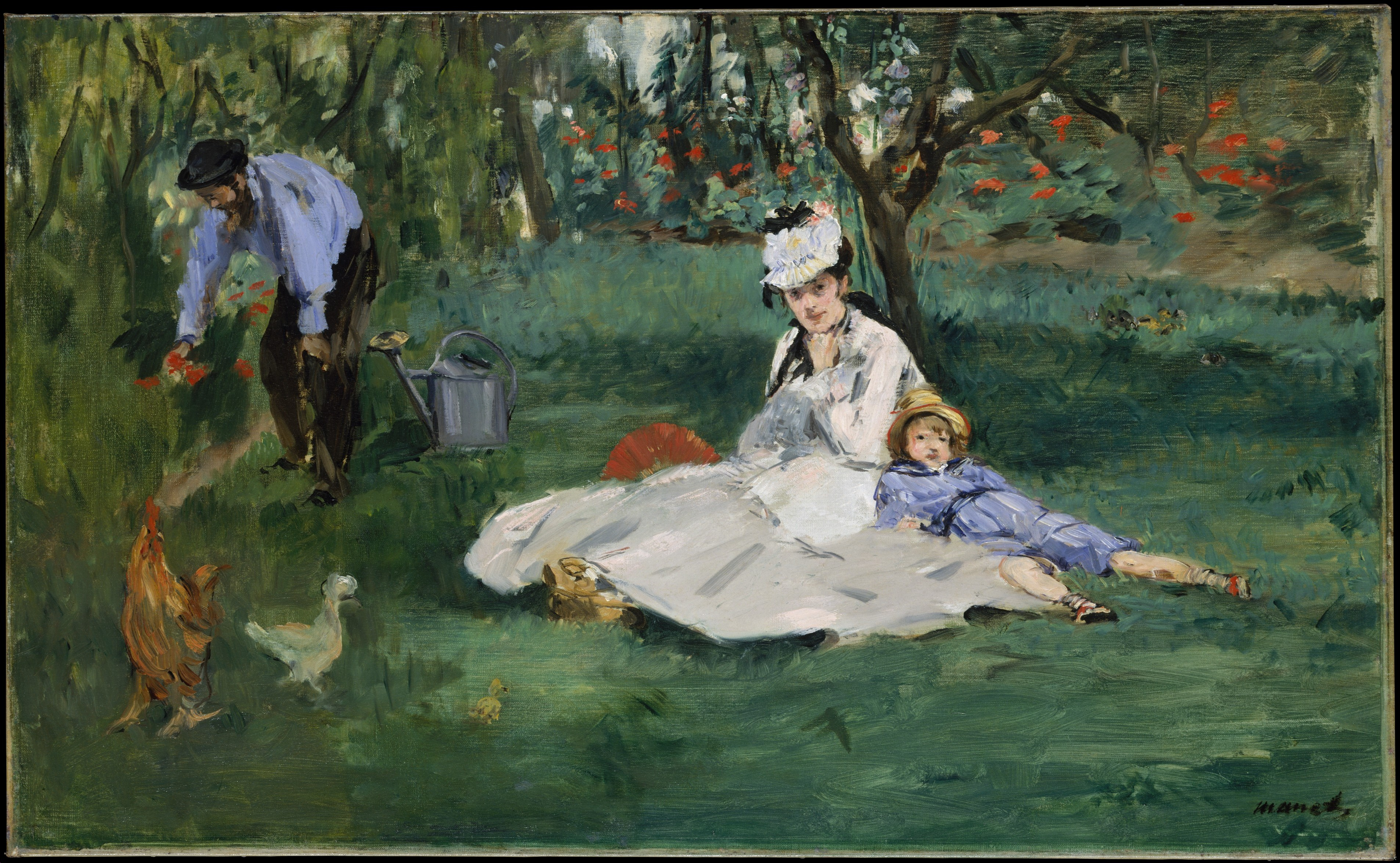
The Monet Family in their Garden, 1874, New York, Metropolitan Museum of Art

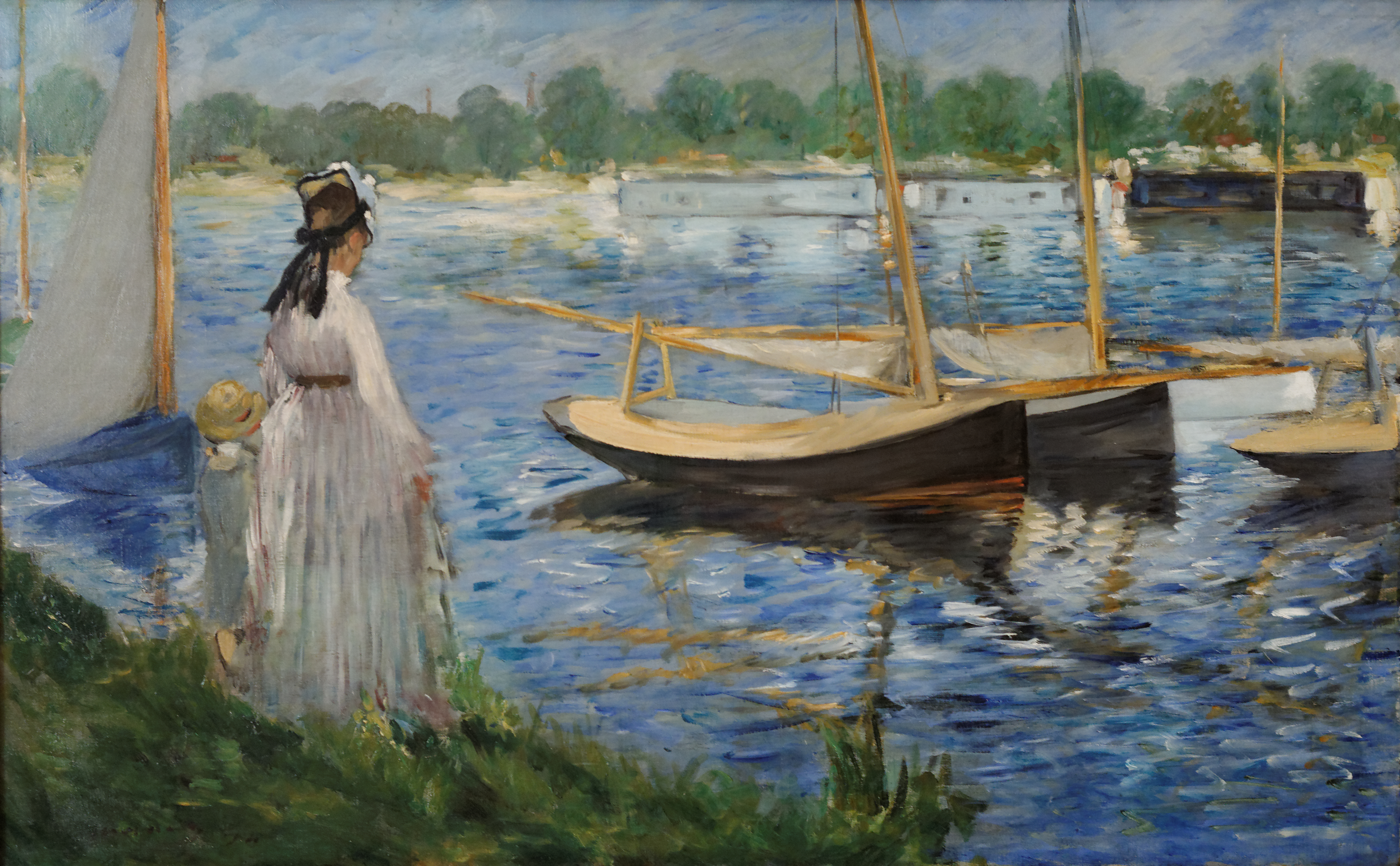
Banks of the Seine at Argenteuil, 1874, Courtauld Gallery

== See also ==
- List of paintings by Édouard Manet
- 1874 in art

== Bibliography ==
- (in Italian) L. Venturi, La via dell'impressionismo : da Manet a Cézanne, G. Einaudi, 1970.
- (in French) Émile Zola, Mon salon : Manet. Écrits sur l'art, Garnier-Flammarion, 1970.
- (in French) J. Wilson-Bareau, « L'année impressionniste de Manet : Argenteuil et Venise en 1874 », Revue de l'Art, 1989.
- (in French) P. Bonafoux, De Manet à Caillebotte : les impressionnistes à Gennevilliers, Éditions Plume, 1993.
