= Madame Auguste Cuoq =

Painting by Gustave Courbet

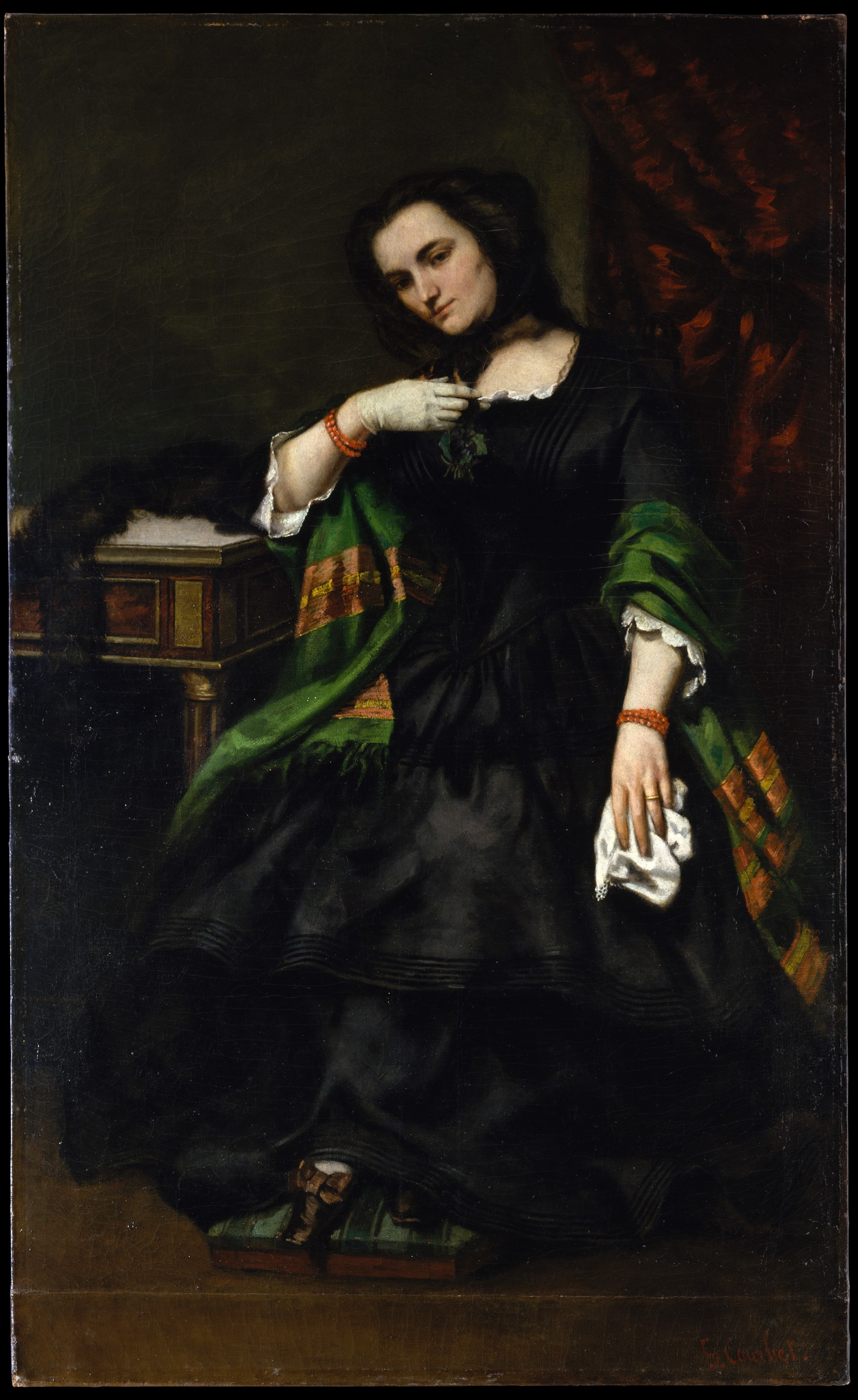
- Artist: Gustave Courbet
- Year: c. 1852–57
- Medium: Oil on canvas
- Subject: Mathilde Desportes
- Dimensions: 176.5 cm × 108 cm (69.5 in × 43 in)
- Location: Metropolitan Museum of Art; New York
- Accession: 29.100.130

Madame Auguste Cuoq is an oil on canvas by French artist Gustave Courbet, from c. 1852–1857. The painting depicts Mathilde Desportes (Madame Auguste Cuoq), a French model who often sat for portraits. The painting is in the collection of the Metropolitan Museum of Art, in New York.

== Description ==
Courbet painted Madame Auguste Cuoq somewhere between 1852 and 1857, and displayed it at an exhibition of his in 1867. The subject of the portrait, the titular Madame Auguste Cuoq, was painted by several notable artists of his time, including Courbet and Jean-Jacques Henner. Notably, Cuoq's husband rejected the portrait, feeling that it did not capture his wife's beauty. Citing its large scale and intimate setting, the painting has been described as one of Courbet's most unusual works. The painting was eventually acquired by the Louisine Havemeyer and later donated by the Havemeyer Collection to the Metropolitan Museum of Art.
