= Portrait of a Young Man with a Book (Bronzino) =

Painting by Bronzino

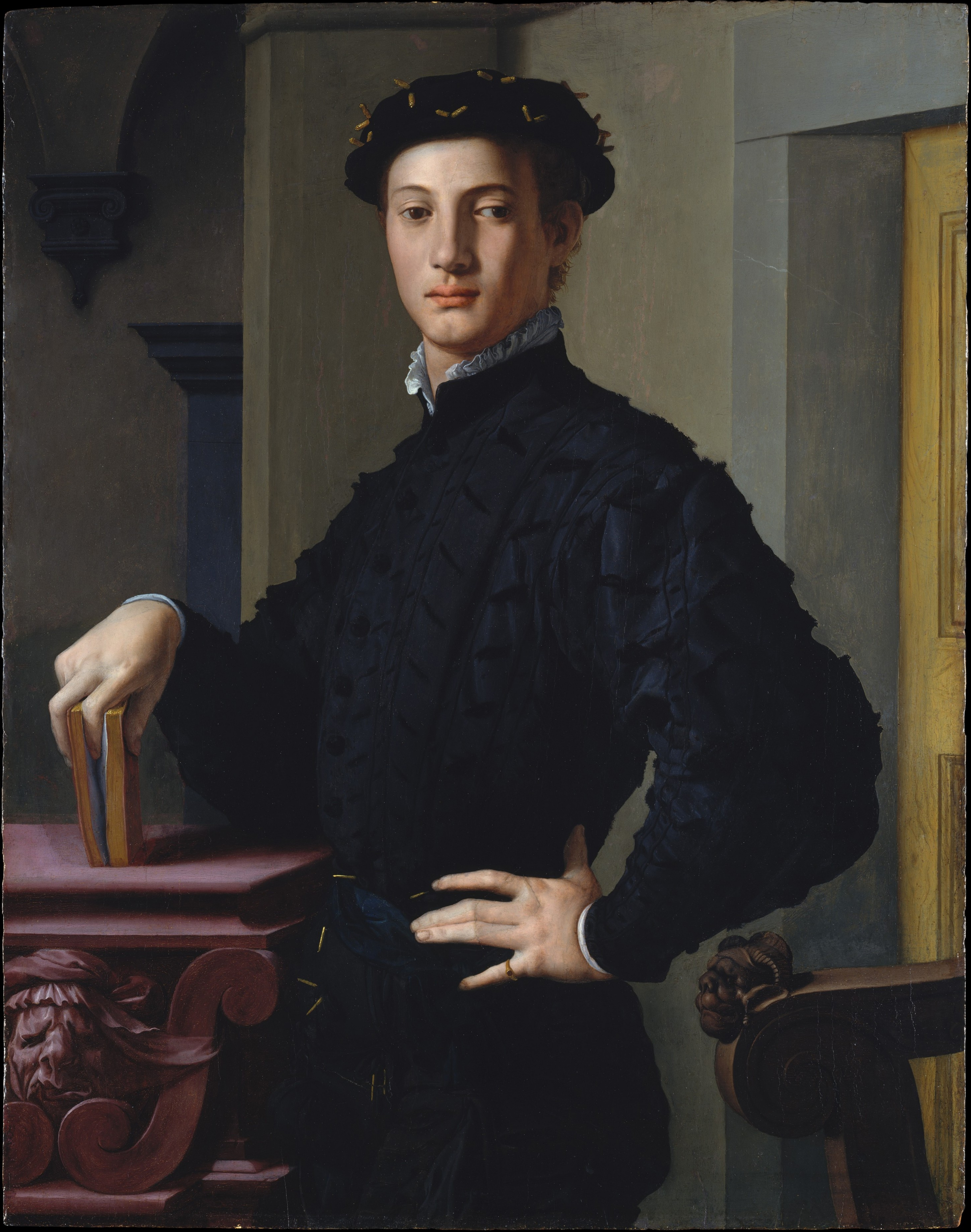
- Artist: Agnolo Bronzino
- Year: 1530s
- Type: Painting
- Medium: Oil on wood
- Dimensions: 95.6 cm × 74.9 cm (37 5/8 in × 29 in)
- Location: Metropolitan Museum; New York
- Accession: 29.100.16
- Website: https://www.metmuseum.org/art/collection/search/435802

The Portrait of a Young Man with a Book is a painting by Agnolo Bronzino created in the 1530s. After its creation, it was owned amongst various aristocrats and art collectors until it entered the collection at the Metropolitan Museum of Art 1929. The painting was commissioned by the powerful Florentine family, the Medici. Bronzino worked as court artist for Cosimo I de' Medici where he became the leading portrait painter in Florence. Bronzino's style of portraits transitioned from more natural to idealized instead, and this shift is evident in the composition of Portrait of a Young Man with a Book, which depicts a young man with his fingers placed inside of a book. Infared reflectology reveals that Bronzino deliberately made changes to achieve his goals for the portrait. This painting has many interpretations as it is unclear who the sitter is exactly.

== Patron, artist, and commission ==
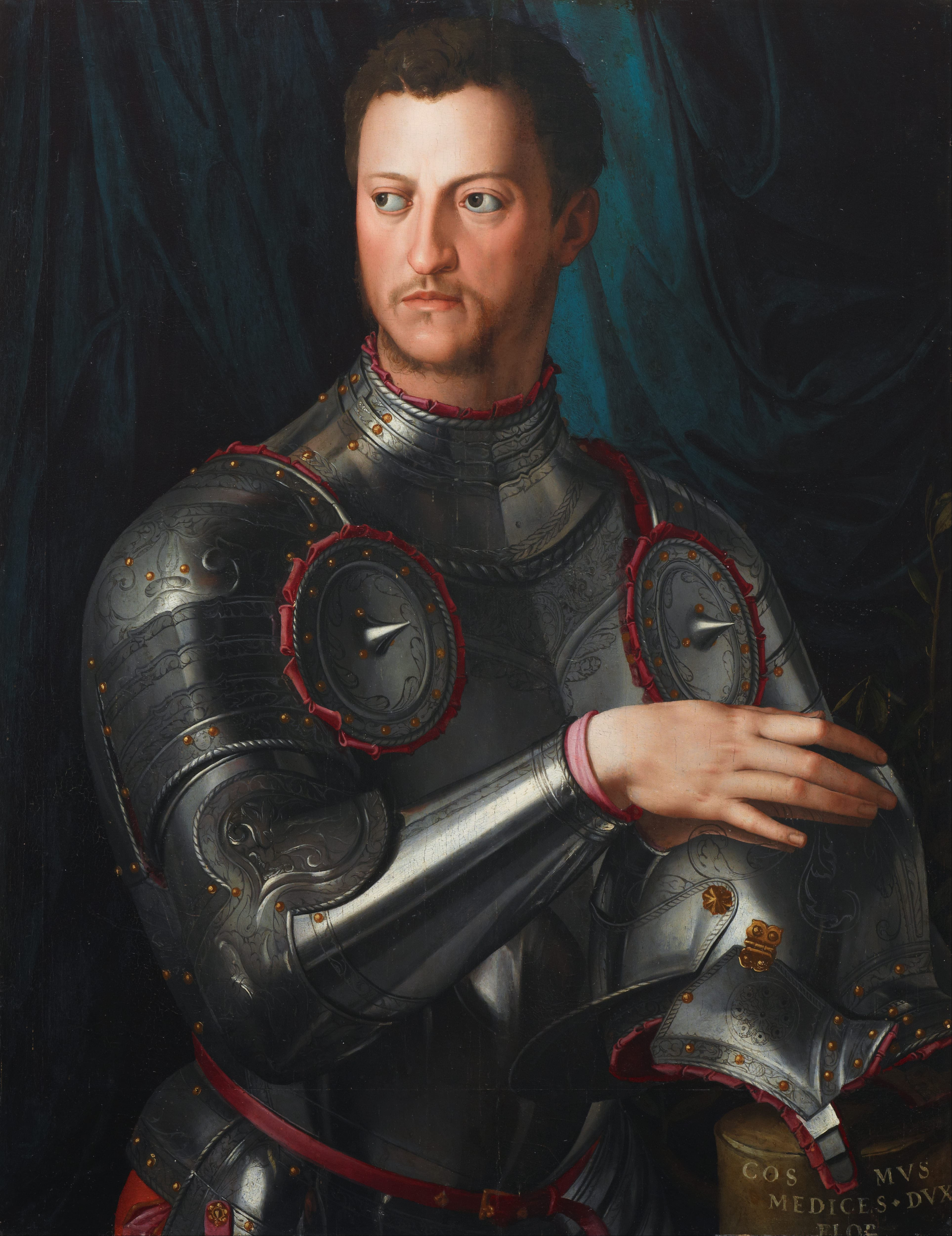
Bronzino, Cosimo I de' Medici in Armor, c. 1545, oil on poplar panel, 46.2 in. x 38.7 in. (117.5 cm x 98.5 cm) Art Gallery of New South Wales, inv. no. 78.1996

Agnolo Bronzino painted Portrait of a Young Man with a Book around the 1530s for Cosimo I de' Medici. The Medici family was the dominant family in Florence from the 15th century up till the 18th century. They were a long line of merchants, bankers, rulers, as well as art patrons and collectors. International trade made them one of the most powerful and wealthiest families in Italy.

Bronzino served as court painter for Cosimo I de' Medici, the Grand Duke of Tuscany. Cosimo I was more powerful than any previous Medici. After Bronzino helped with the decoration for Cosimo I's wedding in 1539, his career as court artist began. Bronzino lead a tapestry weaving project for Cosimo I due to the Duke's dream to have a tapestry cycle that would rival those of the princes in Europe. In the end, he was responsible for the design of sixteen of the weavings. Bronzino played a key role in helping to achieve Cosimo I's goal of creating a court that would rival those of the European princes. At the same time, Bronzino painted a series of court portraits of the Duke, the Duchess, and their children. Bronzino remade the Duke's official portrait many times. Bronzino's portraits of Cosimo I and his family were made to display Cosimo I's power and authority, and further helped Cosimo I's goal of establishing the Medici family as a powerful presence and player in Florence. In 1551, Bronzino joined the ducal family in Pisa to paint more portraits of the Medici children. In 1554, Bronzino was replaced as the favored Medici court artist.

== Description ==
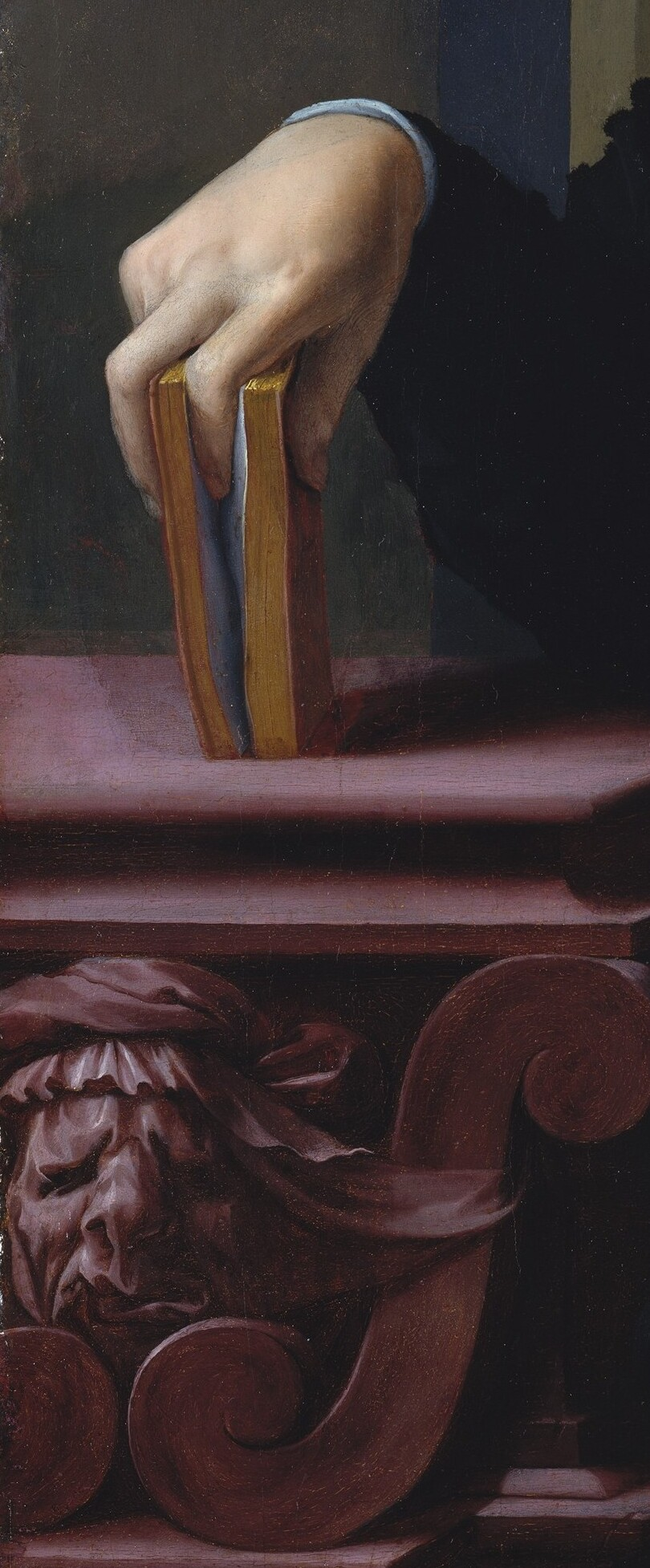
Detail of the sitter's right hand and the table

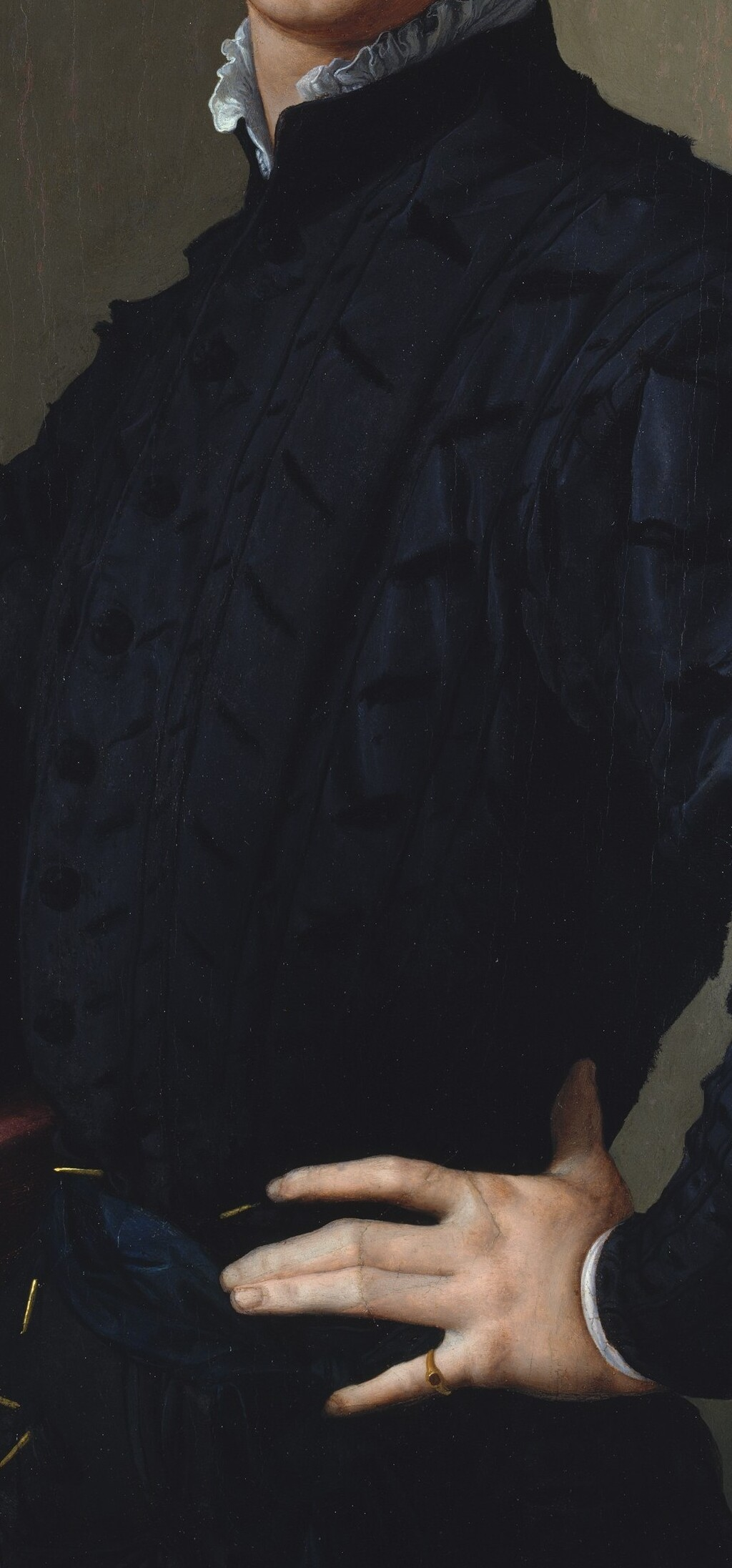
Detail of the sitter's attire

Bronzino's Portrait of a Young Man depicts an unknown youthful man standing in a Florentine palace with his left hand on his hip, while his right hand holds a book, as his fingers fall between the pages. Scholars have noted that while there are no clues offered by Bronzino as to the type the book that the sitter holds—the binding is not shown and no words appear on the page—it has been suggested it is perhaps a book of poetry based on its rather small size and the fact that the papers' edges have been gilded.

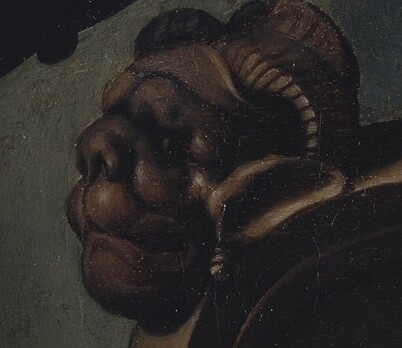
Detail of the grotesque face next to the sitter

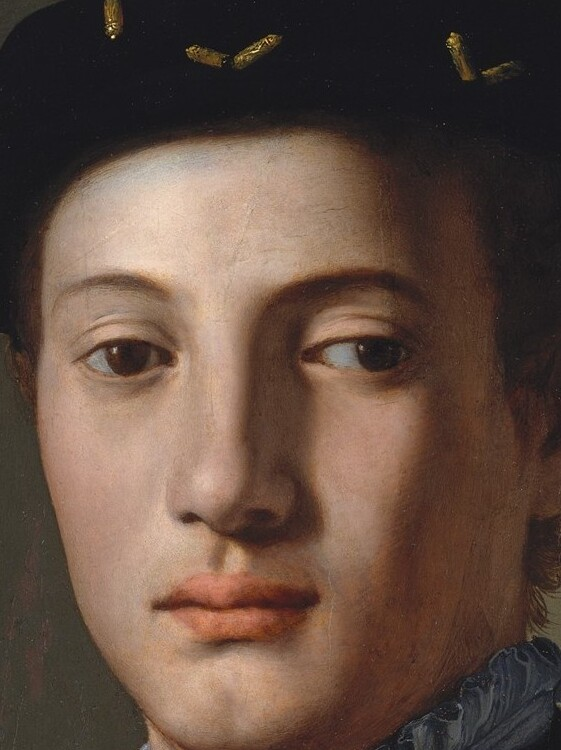
Detail of sitter's misaligned left eye

The subject leans against a table that looks to be carved from purple stone. The table has intricate details, including an engraved grotesque or gargoyle figures. The grotesque mask-like face shares similarities with the other two grotesque faces found on the arm chair to the right of the mans left arm, and in the folds of his breeches. The contorted faces add visual contrast to the subject's stern and aloof facial features. The sitter's misaligned left eye that turns outward represents exotropia. This can affect binocular vision and improper depth perception.

The youthful sitter is adorned in a color coordinated outfit. Equipped with a black doublet made to look of satin, he wears slashed sleeves that were an elite status symbol in fashion at the time. Furthermore, the jagged edges of the sleeves demonstrate Bronzino's interest in detailed features that are characteristic of the Manneristic style of the time. He also wears a camicia, a type of shirt with a white ruffled collar, along with a blue belt, a ring on his left pinky finger, and a cap and ties that are decorated with gold aglets (ciondoli).

== Interpretation and analysis ==
Bronzino was an avid poet and quite interested in the expressive power of books. He often displayed his admiration of changing the meaning of an everyday object into something else throughout many of his poems. This concept is displayed within the portrait itself through the grotesque trio of grotesque mask-like faces (discussed above) that exude a sense of playfulness creating a contrast from the dignity and elegance of the portrait.

=== Identification of the sitter ===
Although the identity of the sitter remains unknown, there have been three possible identifications being proposed, all of which were friends of Bronzino. The leading theory is that the sitter represents Bonaccorso Pinadori (b.1502) an affluent spice merchant who also sold artist's supplies and materials in a shop owned by Lodovico Capponi.

Other scholars have put forth the possibility that the sitter is Benedetto Busini (b. 1513), a Florentine banker who worked at the Strozzi bank's branch in Rome and who had had his portrait painted by Federico Zuccari. While Zaccari's painting was created decades after Bronzino's painting, it shows the sitter with the same type of lazy eye, thereby making him the possible sitter for Bronzino's work.

Finally, a third theory has been advanced that the sitter was Antonio Lupi (b. 1527), who was described in a letter a 1544 written by one of Bronzino's friends, Antonfrancesco Grazzini (called Il Lasca), that Lupi was the subject of a painting. However, if Lupi is the sitter, the date that scholars believe that Bronzino's portrait was made, in the 1530s, is not possible.

Whoever the sitter was, he perhaps shared Bronzino's appreciation for examining the meaning behind mask and hidden faces. With the sitter being placed above the mask, he is able to rise above the humor as an embodiment of being serene and collected.

== Underdrawings ==
With the advancements of technology in the 1930s, studies of x-radiography using infrared reflectography were able to show the changes made by Bronzino throughout the creation of the portrait. The artist utilized two distinct techniques and materials: first, Bronzino made markings of the white imprimatura with a tool (most likely the butt of a brush), and second, he used chalk or charcoal combined with a liquid pigment.

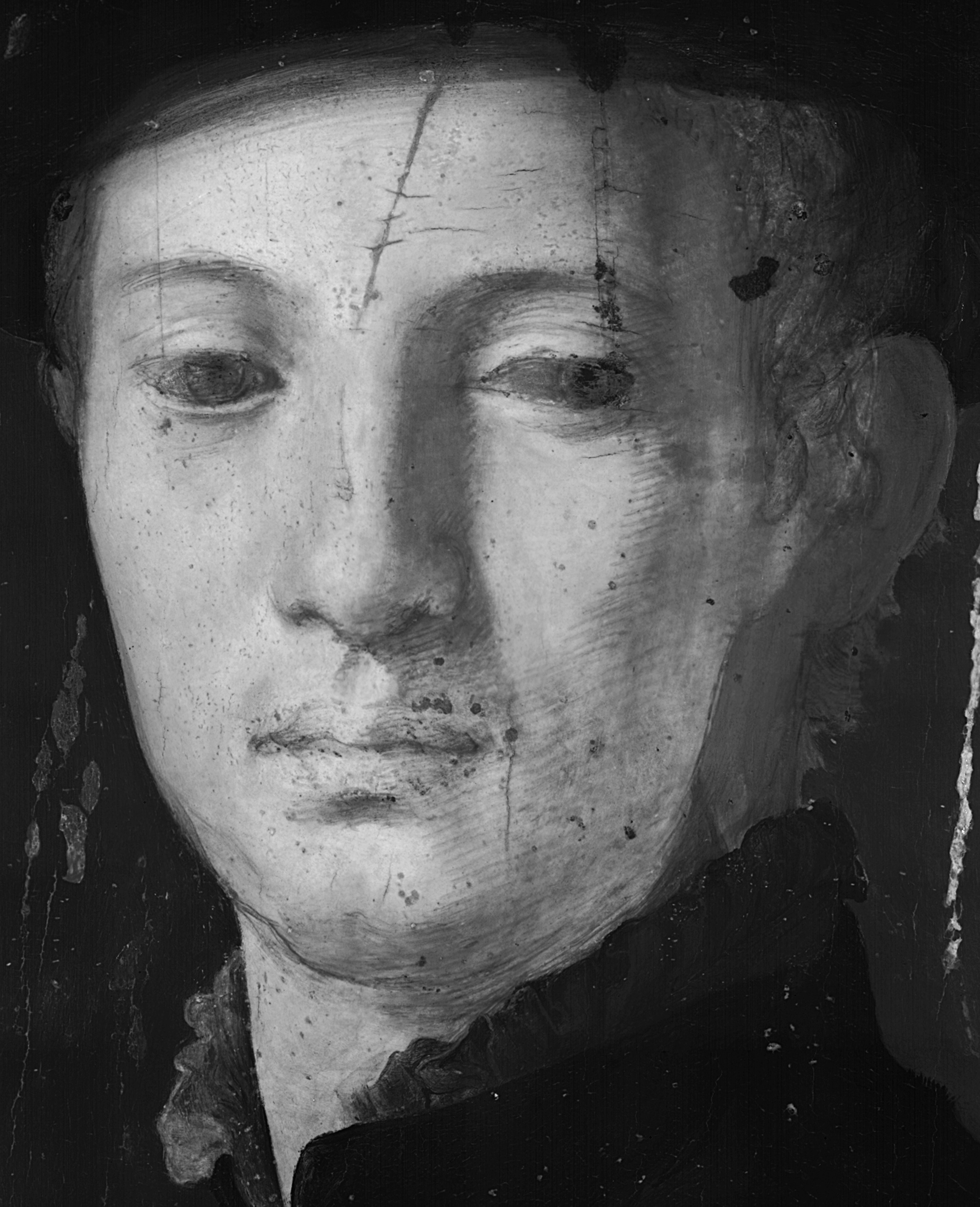
Infared reflectograph photo of the sitter's face

As seen through the infrared reflectographs, the changes vary in significance. For instance, the sitter's head was narrower to begin with and his features were less idealized lending to more harmonious proportions and ageless appearance. The placement of the features did stay intact proving that only one sitter was involved.

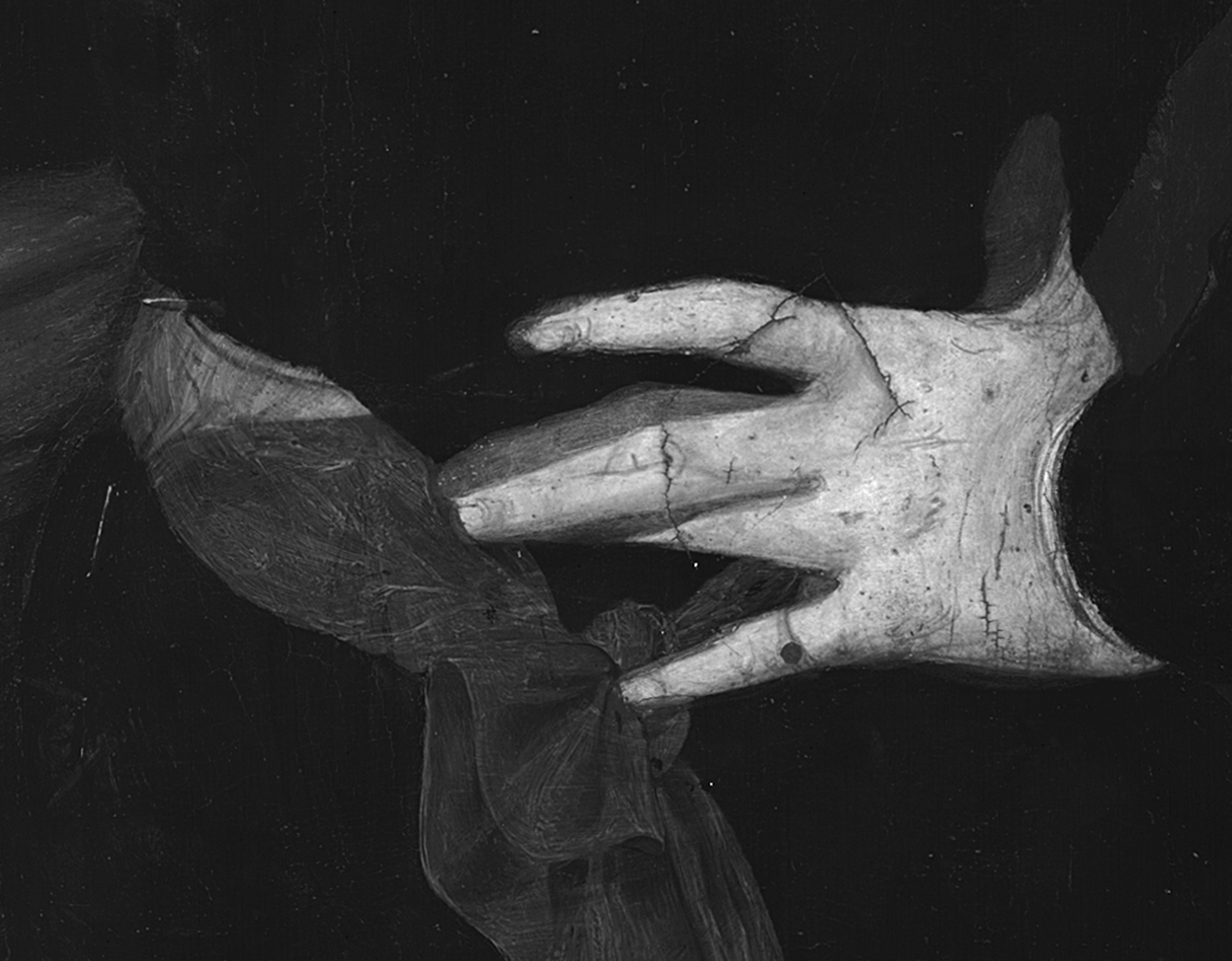
Infared reflectograph photo of the sitter's left hand

The artist had a clear focus on the sitter's hands and on the grotesque mask-like decorations that are featured on the bottom section of the painting, such as on the table (on the left) on the arm of the chair (on the right). A third grotesque mask is created solely by the folds of the fabric of the sitter's breeches or trunk hose (near the sitter's codpiece) and would have been further emphasized by a pair of folded gloves, later painted over, that were originally designed to be tucked within the ties of the sitter's codpiece.

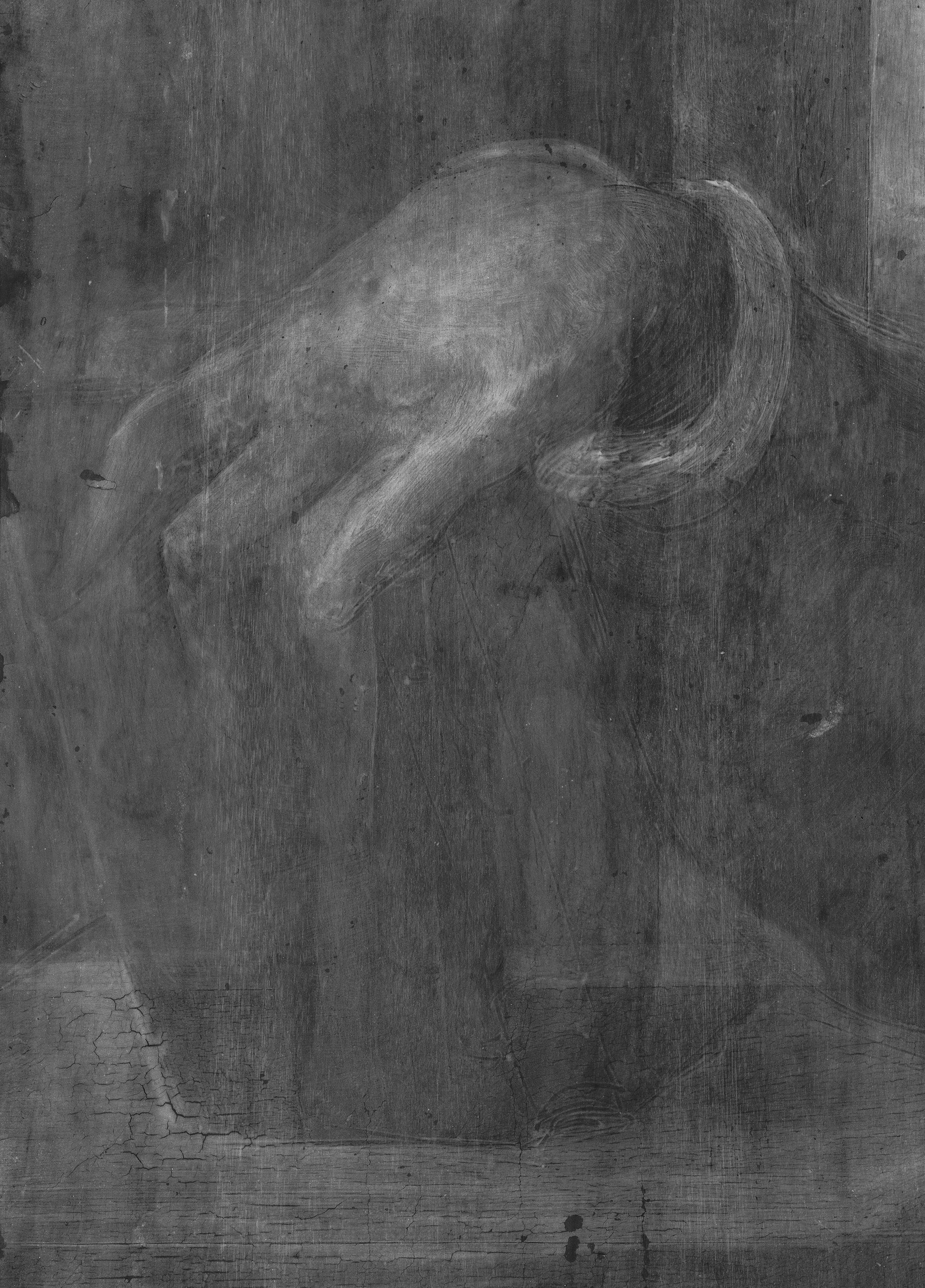
Infared reflectograph photo of the sitter's right hand with book

The book that the sitter holds was originally shown fully open with the sitter's hands resting upon the upper edge, but was changed to the hand's position so that it marks a specific page or passage. This infers that the sitter was interrupted while reading.

Moreover, Bronzino's first layout of the composition included a diagonal architectural feature that was located directly behind the sitter, an approach that scholars argue is similar to a Portrait of Cosimo I de' Medici attributed to Pontormo that was listed in a Sotheby's catalog for July 2009 and again in a Christie's catalog (sold January 2014). When comparing the two, it is clear that both paintings share a similar aspect to the pose as a comparable backdrop with gray walls accented with pietra serena. Furthermore, Bronzino modified the walls to be a smooth backdrop forming an angle creating a defined space, with the intention of a setting that more centrally frames the sitter within the architectural elements.

== Style ==
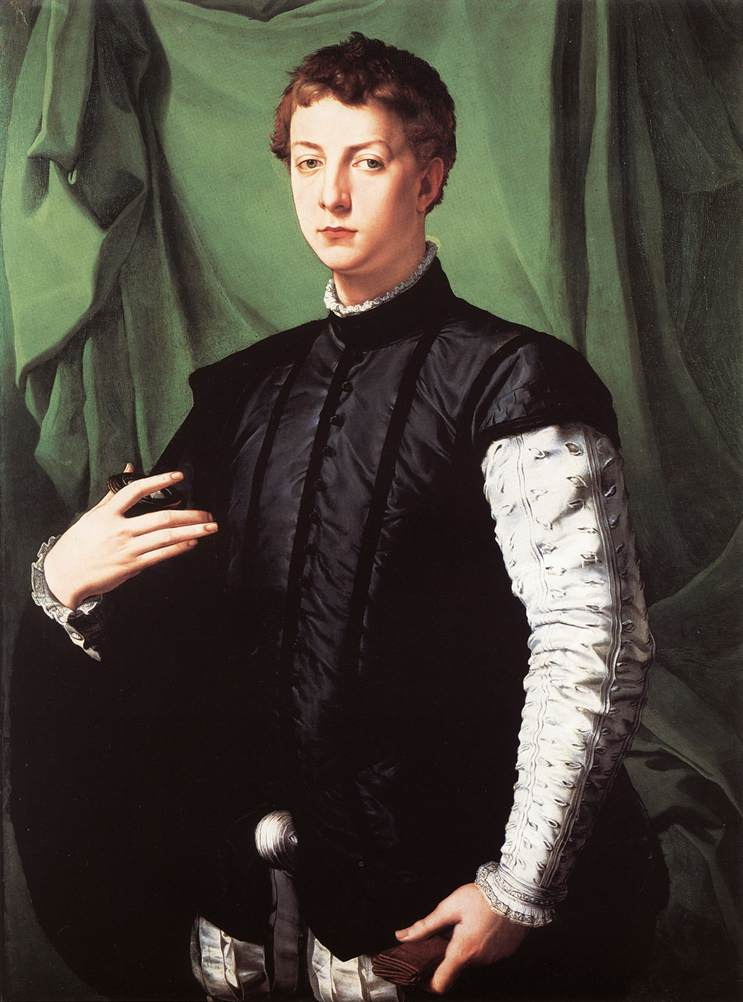
Bronzino, Ludovico Capponi, c. 1550–1555, oil on panel, 45 7/8 in. x 33 3/4 in. (116.5 cm. x 85.7 cm), Frick Collection, inv. no. 1915.1.19

By the early 1540s Bronzino had become the leading portrait painter in Florence. Bronzino's portraits earned praise for being well executed and natural. His first portraits were more freely painted and less precise, as seen in the portrait of Lorenzo Lenzi, than his later ones. For example, Bronzino's portrait of Ludovico Capponi (c. 1550–1555) is more smooth and has more controlled brushwork. The earlier ones also show the sitter in a more natural position compared to his later ones that are more idealized. Bronzino also depicted elaborate and ambiguous settings to create a visual juxtaposition between the sitter and setting.

In Portrait of a Young Man with a Book he emphasizes the social status of the sitter more rather than a human connection. Bronzino mixed elegant designs with detachment from the sitter through a masklike appearance. The face Bronzino originally sketched was much coarser than the final face, revealed by infared reflectography (for more see below: Underdrawings section), showing the artist's switch to a more idealized version of the sitter. Portrait of a Young Man with a Book shows the change in Bronzino's style so well because it was painted in two distinct campaigns. While the accepted completion date ranges to the 1530s, the starting date is accepted to be 1529 or 1530.

== Provenance ==
Portrait of a Young Man with a Book was created around the 1530s or 1540s for Cosimo I de' Medici. From there the piece can be traced to Lucien Bonaparte, Prince of Canino, Rome, and also Napoleon's brother by 1808. It was then sold at an auction in London in 1816, where it was listed in the sale catalog as "A Florentine Gentleman" by Sebastiano del Piombo. It was then acquired by Charles J. Nieuwenhuys, London in 1816. By 1841, the painting belonged to Count James-Alexandre de Pourtalès in Paris and the painting's attribution remained as Sebastiano del Piombo. After the Count's death in 1855, the painting was included in his estate sale in 1865. Baron Achille Seilliére, a French aristocrat living in the Château de Mello, purchased the painting at the estate sale in 1865 and had it until his death in 1873. Then, the painting passed to his daughter Jeanne Marguérite Seilliére, who became then Princesse de Sagan and later Duchesse de Talleyrand-Périgord in Paris. The painting was later acquired by M. Bourdariat in Paris and sold in 1898 to Durand-Ruel for 140,000 French francs and in turn sold it in the same year for $40,000 to the Havemeyer family. The Havemeyers were renowned art collectors in New York, owned the painting until Henry Osborne Havemeyer's death in 1907. After her husband's death, Louisine Havemeyer retained ownership until her death in 1929, at which point at her bequest, it entered the collection at the Metropolitan Museum of Art.

== Bibliography ==
- The Metropolitan Museum of Art Guide, The Metropolitan Museum of Art/Yale University Press, New York/New Haven 1994/2005. ISBN 0-87099-710-6
