= Claude Monet Painting in His Garden at Argenteuil =

1873 painting by Pierre-Auguste Renoir

Monet Painting in His Garden at Argenteuil
- Artist: Pierre-Auguste Renoir
- Year: 1873
- Medium: Oil on canvas
- Dimensions: 61 cm × 50 cm (24 in × 20 in)
- Location: Wadsworth Atheneum, Hartford, Connecticut, US

Claude Monet Painting in His Garden at Argenteuil is an 1873 Impressionist painting by Pierre-Auguste Renoir.

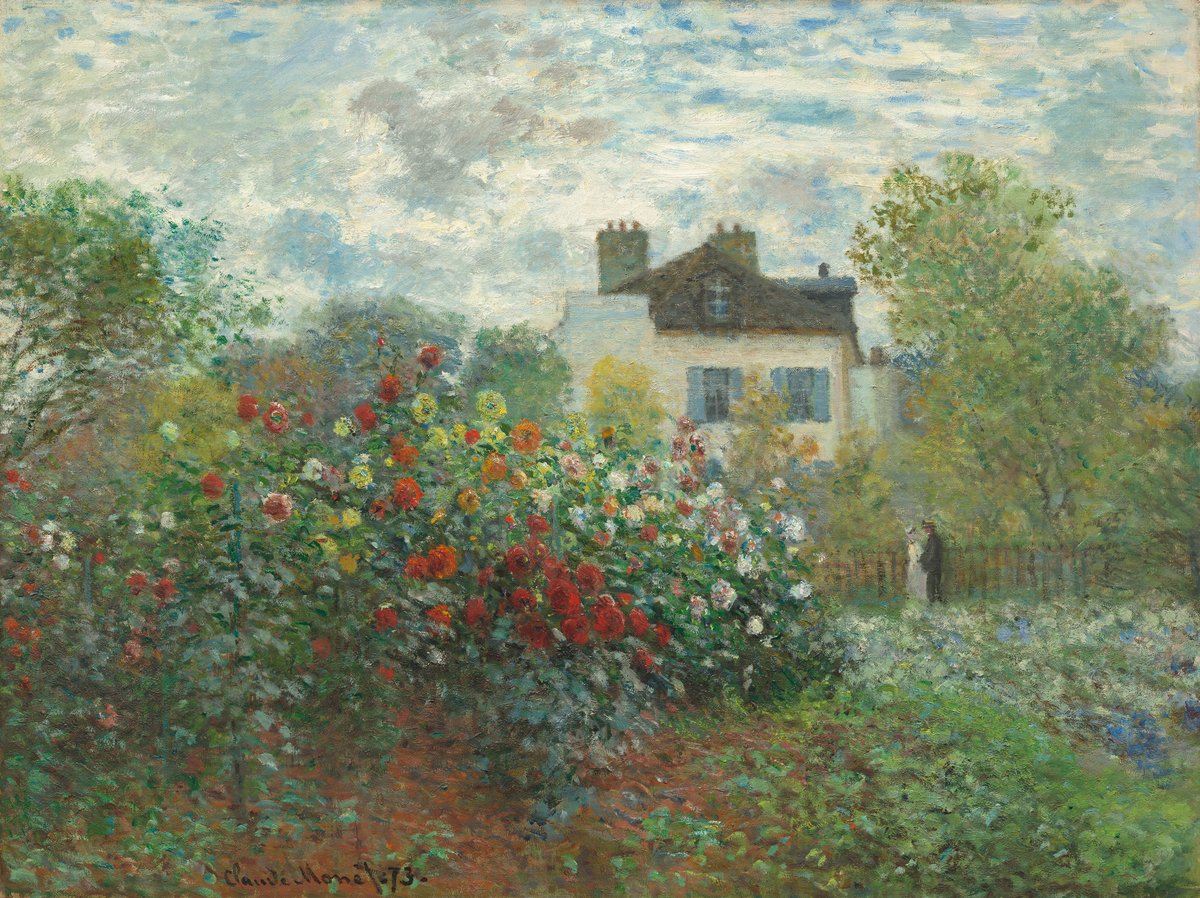
Claude Monet: Jardin de l'artiste de Monet, 1873

== See also ==
- List of paintings by Pierre-Auguste Renoir
- The Improvised Field Hospital, 1865 painting by Frédéric Bazille
- A Studio at Les Batignolles, 1870 painting by Henri Fantin-Latour
- Claude Monet Painting in his Studio, 1874 painting by Édouard Manet
- Portrait of the painter Claude Monet, 1875 painting by Renoir
