= Boating (Manet) =

1874 painting by Édouard Manet

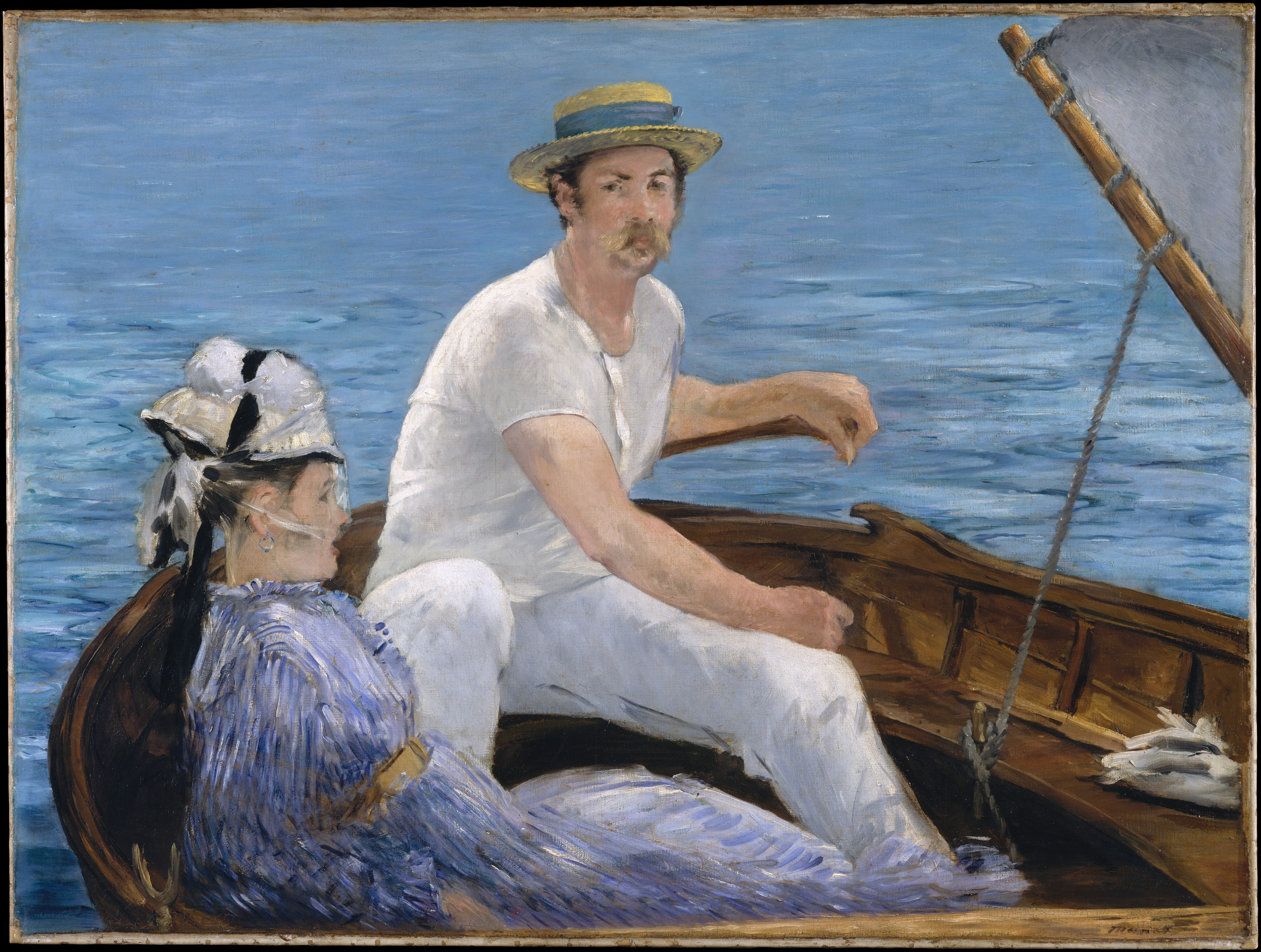
- Artist: Edouard Manet
- Year: 1874
- Medium: Oil on canvas
- Dimensions: 97.2 cm × 130.2 cm (38.3 in × 51.3 in)
- Location: Metropolitan Museum of Art; New York
- Accession: 29.100.115

Boating is an oil-on-canvas painting by French artist Édouard Manet. The painting depicts a man and woman on a sailboat during the summertime. It was painted in the summer of 1874, during which time Manet was staying on his family's property in Gennevilliers. Art historians have suggested that the woman may be Camille Monet, while the man has often been identified as Manet's brother-in-law Rodolphe Leenhoff.

Boating is often cited as Manet's foray into Impressionism based on its brushwork and subject matter. While Manet did not call himself an Impressionist, he often showed his paintings in galleries with other Impressionists. He was friends with many artists of time who did consider themselves to be a part of the impressionist movement.

The work was shown in the Salon of 1879. Mary Mathews Gedo, a former clinical psychologist turned art historian, has described Boating as "quintessentially Monet Esque". It is currently displayed at the Metropolitan Museum of Art in New York City in Gallery 818.

== Background ==
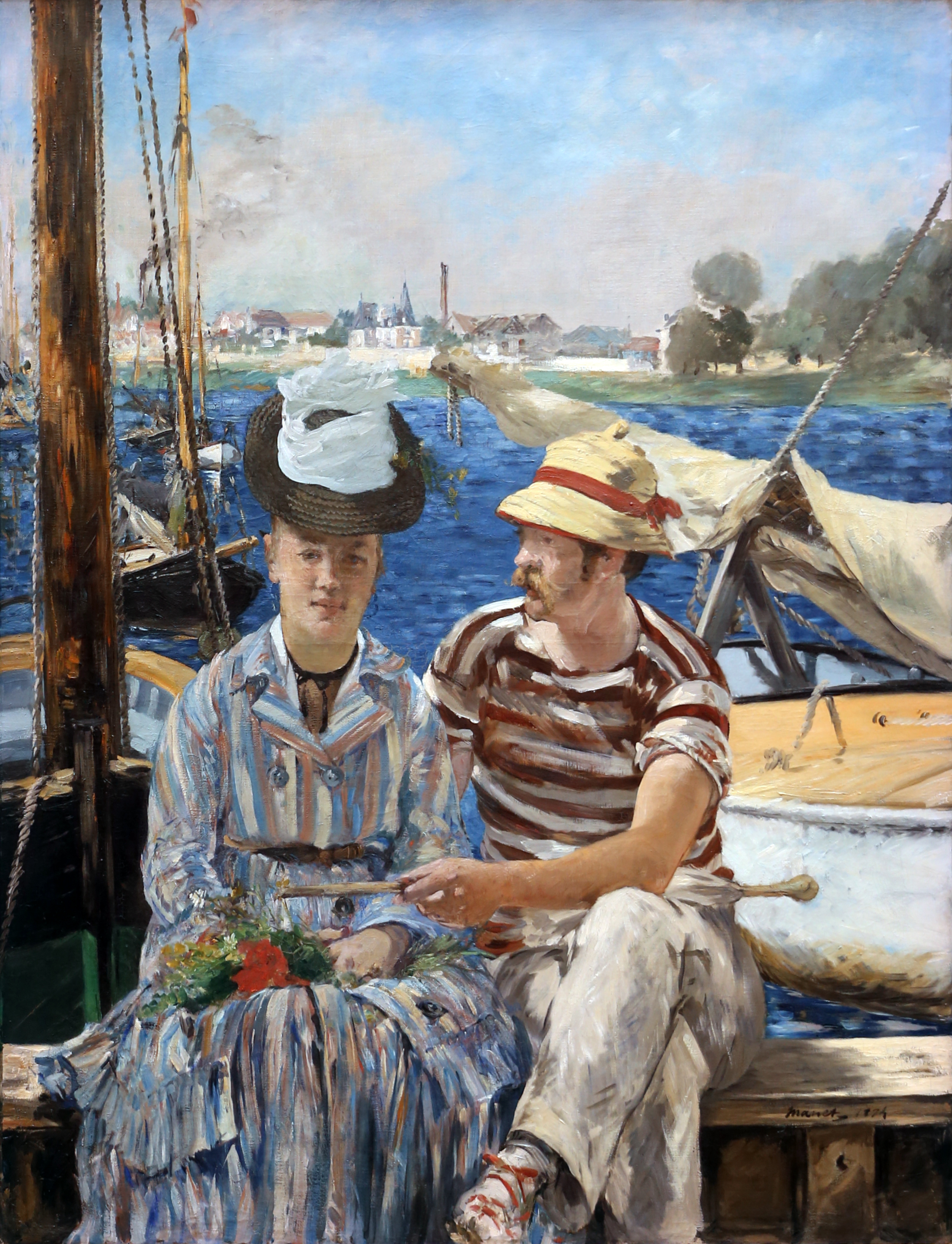
Argenteuil (Manet) painted in 1874

Throughout his career, Manet was infatuated with water, painting it numerous times over two decades. The art historian John Leighton has observed that the Impressionist interest in water is often associated with spontaneity, but he cautions that this "masks a long process of revision and refinement." Manet's work often captures intense moments, where everything in his paintings are deliberate. This is the case during his 1874 trip to Argenteuil.

During the summer of 1874, Manet was working on many paintings including Boating and its sister painting, Argenteuil (Manet). The techniques that were used in Boating were new to Manet. During this time in his life, Manet was increasingly focused on the Impressionist theme of everyday life and seemingly mundane subjects.

== Description and analysis ==
Boating is considered one of the most important Impressionist paintings that Manet had painted. It depicts a young couple sailing on a beautiful sunny summer day in France. Radiographs have revealed that the painting was worked on many different times, leading art historians to believe that he painted it both outdoors on the boat as well as in his studio. , changing the man's pose many times.

In Boating, Manet introduced various new techniques. One new technique involved abrupt cropping. According to Stéphane Mallarmé, Manet's use of framing (inspired by Japanese artists) defines the scene as a whole. Other techniques include the higher-keyed coloration, freer brush strokes, and intense colors with dark backgrounds. It is argued that these newer techniques are due to Manet increasing the amount of time he spent with younger Impressionists of the time.

=== Figures ===
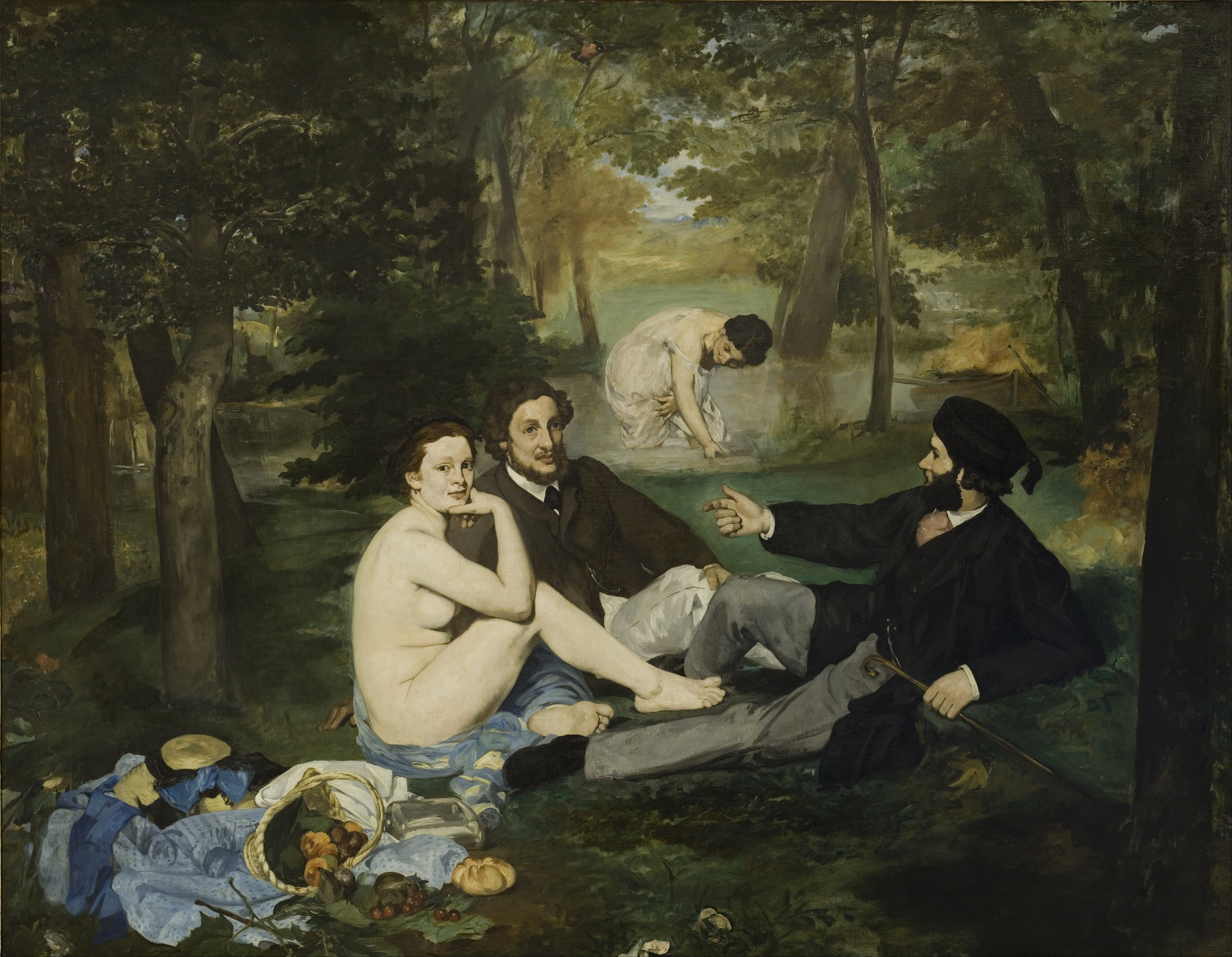
Luncheon on the Grass, one of the first depictions of Leenhoff posing for Manet

The man shown is Rodolphe Leenhoff, brother-in-law to Manet. Leenhoff himself was a sculptor. He posed for Manet often, first appearing in Luncheon on the Grass. At the time of painting Luncheon on the Grass, Manet and Leenhoff were not yet related, as Manet had not met Suzanne Manet. Manet was known to annoy his models, as he preferred natural poses. However, models wanted to use academic poses they had learned to show off their talents. This meant that Manet often searched for non-professional models.

The identity of the woman has been debated for years. Originally, the woman was thought to be Mme. Manet due to the hat she is wearing. This hat appears on Manet's wife in many of his other works. However the woman in Boating has dark black hair and brown eyes, dissimilar to Mme. Manet. It is now believed that the hat was selected to be worn from Mme. Manet's collection. Today, art historians such as Mary Matthews Gedo believe that the woman in both Boating and Argenteuil is Camille Monet. The fasciation with hats was due to Manet's self-identification as a "hat man", often enjoying portraying women in lavish clothing and interesting hats.

== Influences ==
=== Claude Monet ===
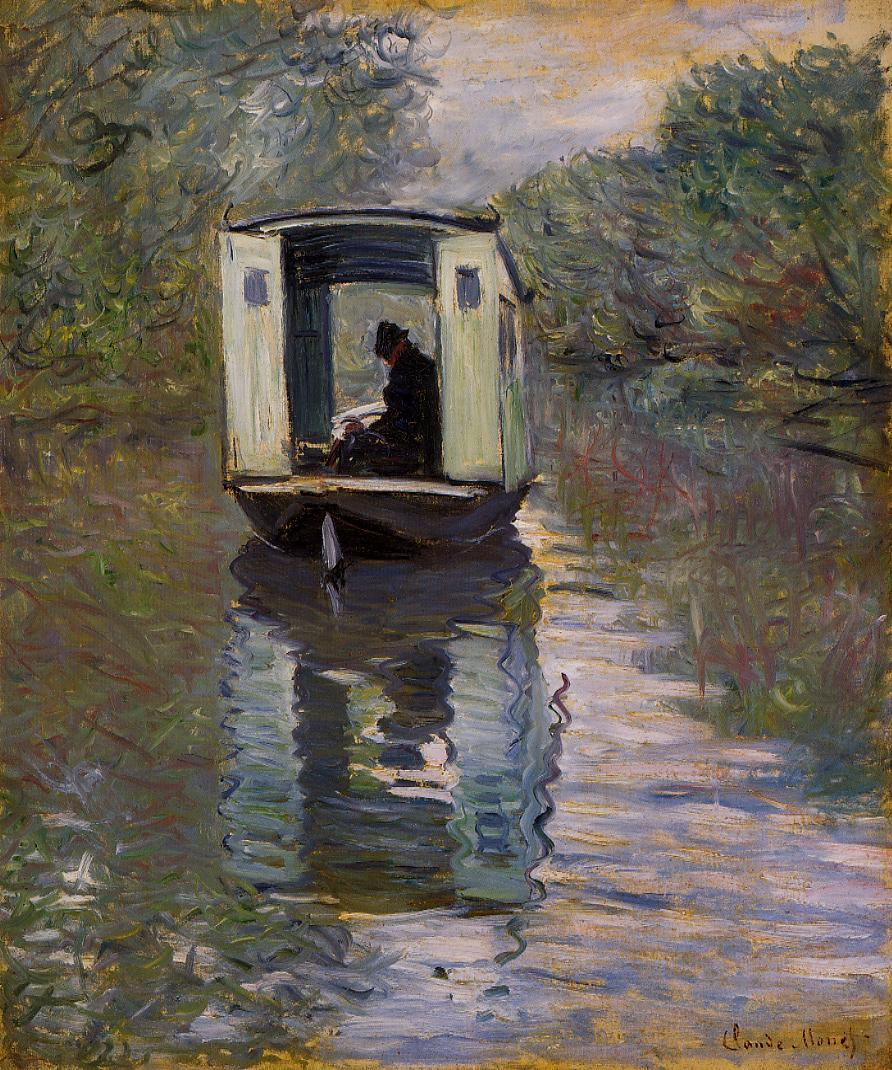
Monet's studio boat, as painted by Claude Monet in 1873.

Manet was often inspired by his friend Claude Monet's work and style. Their work has often been exhibited together. Inspired by Monet's ability to paint on his floating studio, Manet wanted to paint the famous Impressionist on the floating studio along with Monet's wife Camille Monet. This idea, however proved harder to achieve. Manet sourced other models and then painted both Argenteuil and Boating without Monet.

=== Japonisme ===
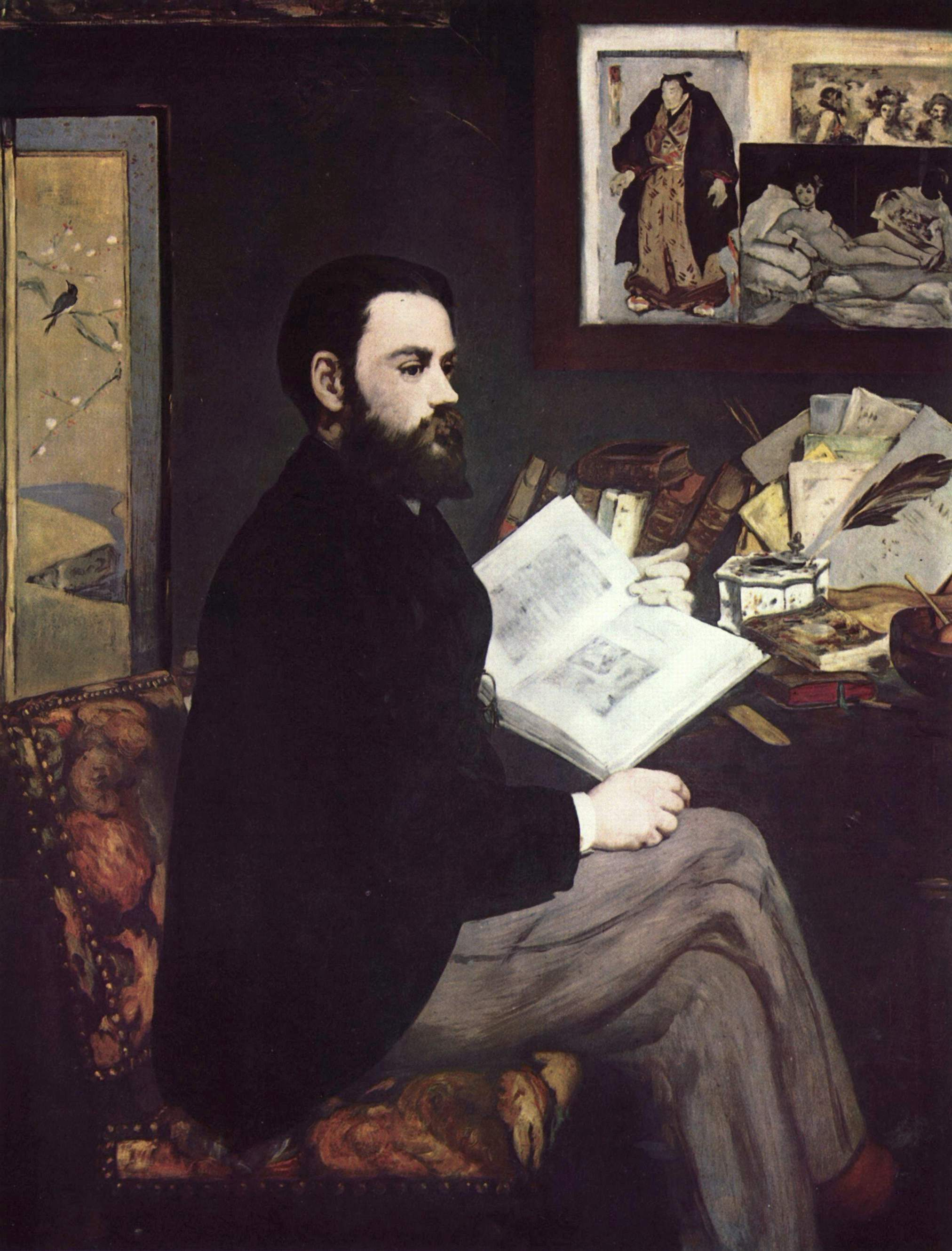
Portrait of Emile Zola (1868) is an example of the beginning of Japanese arts influence on European art. Manet inserted a full Japanese painting into this painting of Zola, a critique.

Along with many painters of the time, Manet was influenced by Japanese art, as part of the broader movement known as Japonisme. Some important qualities that Manet picked up included two-dimensional composition, lighter coloring, and cropping of the field of view. In Boating, Manet purposely cut off the boat where the two figures are sitting, a tool used by Japanese artists. Some of the colors including the harsh blue in the water is also Japanese inspired.

== Exhibition and ownership ==
The painting was originally shown at the Salon of 1879. When Mary Cassatt saw the work there, she called it "the last word in painting." After the Salon, Boating was sold to Victor Desfosses, a banker, art collector, and director of Gil Blas.

The painting was later acquired by Cassatt's close friends Louisine and Henry Osborne Havemeyer, who donated the painting to the Metropolitan Museum of Art upon their deaths.

== See also ==
- List of paintings by Édouard Manet

== Sources ==
- Bourdieu, Pierre (2017). Manet: A Symbolic Revolution. Polity Press. ISBN 978-1-5095-0009-3.
- Cachin, Françoise (1983). Manet, 1832-1883: Galeries Nationales Du Grand Palais, Paris, April 22-August 8, 1983, the Metropolitan Museum of Art, New York, September 10-November 27, 1983. Metropolitan Museum of Art. ISBN 978-0-8109-1346-2.
- Gedo, Mary Mathews (2010). Monet and His Muse: Camille Monet in the Artist's Life. University of Chicago Press. ISBN 978-0-226-28480-4.
- Herbert, Robert L. (1988). Impressionism: Art, Leisure, and Parisian Society. Yale University Press. ISBN 978-0-300-04262-7.
- Kloner, Jay Martin (1968). The Influence of Japanese Prints on Edouard Manet and Paul Gauguin (Thesis). ProQuest 302318443.
- Leighton, John (2004). Edouard Manet: Impressions of the Sea. Van Gogh Museum. ISBN 978-2-930117-31-7.
