= Portrait of the Painter Claude Monet =

1875 painting by Pierre-Auguste Renoir

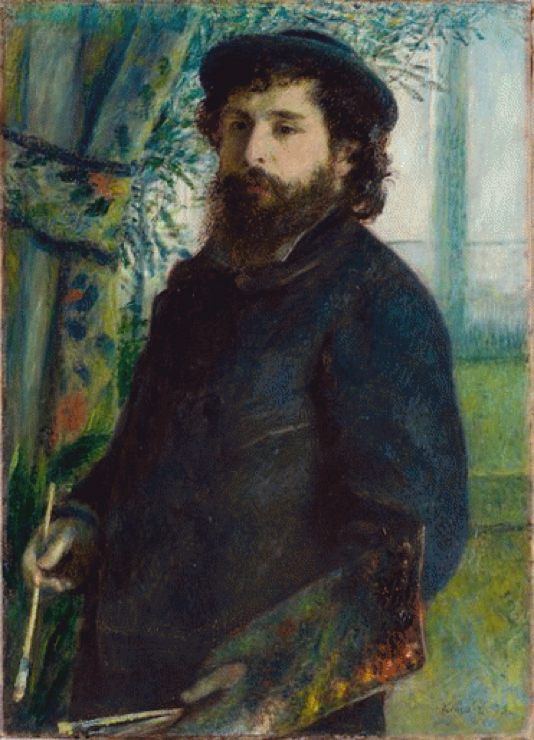
Pierre-Auguste Renoir's 1875 Portrait of the Painter Claude Monet is exhibited in the Musée d'Orsay in Paris

Portrait of the Painter Claude Monet is an 1875 oil on canvas portrait of Claude Monet by Pierre-Auguste Renoir. It is exhibited in the Musée d'Orsay in Paris.

== See also ==
- List of paintings by Pierre-Auguste Renoir
- The Improvised Field Hospital, 1865 painting by Frédéric Bazille
- A Studio at Les Batignolles, 1870 painting by Henri Fantin-Latour
- Claude Monet Painting in His Garden at Argenteuil, 1873 painting by Renoir
- Claude Monet Painting in his Studio, 1874 painting by Édouard Manet
