= Portrait of an Old Woman with Folded Hands =

1640 portrait painting

Portrait of an Old Woman
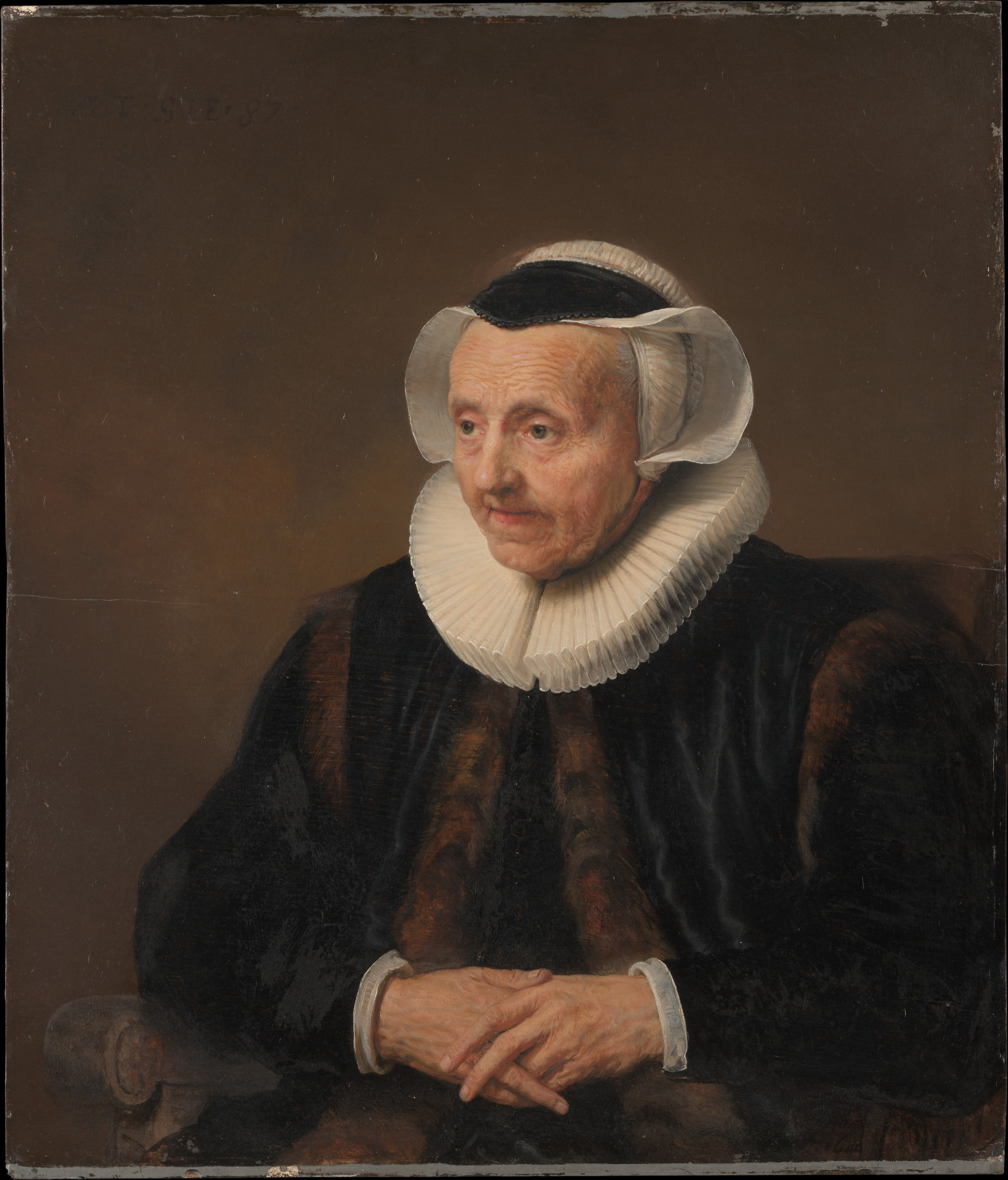
- Year: c. 1640
- Location: Metropolitan Museum of Art

Portrait of an Old Woman is a c. 1640 portrait painting painted in the style of Jacob Adriaensz. Backer. It shows an old woman with folded hands. It is in the collection of the Metropolitan Museum of Art.

== Description ==
Several portraits of older people of 17th-century Amsterdam have survived, and sometimes these were pendants and sometimes they were individual portraits. This painting was attributed to Rembrandt for more than a century, but the name of the sitter is unknown. During the course of the 20th-century, this painting was attributed to Jacob Adriaensz. Backer, and today it is considered a portrait from circa 1640, but the painter is as yet unknown. The woman is probably from Amsterdam, but could possibly have been from another Dutch city. It is inscribed with her age of 87, which indicates a long and therefore privileged life. Her wealth is further emphasized by her fur-lined vlieger. This painting came into the collection via the Mrs. H. O. Havemeyer bequest.

This painting was documented by Hofstede de Groot in 1914, who wrote; 870. A WOMAN WITH FOLDED HANDS. Wb. 307; B.-HdG. 278. Half-length; life size. She sits in an arm-chair, inclined to the left, and looks in that direction. Her elbows rest on the chair-arms; her hands are folded. She wears a white cap with outstanding sides shaped like a mussel-shell, and over it a small black cap; a soft broad ruff, and a black jacket, trimmed with fur at the bosom and shoulders, over a dark gown, with narrow wristbands. Lighted evenly from the front. Brown background. Signed to the right, "Rembrandt f. 1640," and inscribed to the left at top, " AET SVAE 87 "; oak panel, 27 1/2 inches by 24 inches.
An old copy on panel, 41 inches by 35 inches was:

Mentioned by Waagen, iv. 66; Dutuit, p. 49; Michel, p. 268 [206, 434]; Bode, Studien, p. 461].
Exhibited at Manchester, 1857, No. 696; in the Royal Academy Exhibition, London, 1890, No. 147, and 1899, No. 65; and is
In the collection of the Earl of Yarborough.

Etched by Bracquemond in the San Donato catalogue, 1868; by Ramus in the Narischkine catalogue.
Mentioned by Vosmaer, p. 523; Dutuit, p. 20; Michel, pp. 268, 561 [206, note, describing it as a copy, and treating Lord Yarborough's version as the original]. Exhibited at the Hudson-Fulton Celebration, Metropolitan Museum, New York, 1909, No. 89.
Sales. Gerrit Muller, Amsterdam, April 2, 1827. Comte F. de Robiano, Brussels, May 1, 1837, No. 543 (6000 francs, Nieuwenhuys). In the possession of D. Nieuwenhuys, Brussels. Sales. Anatoly Nikolaievich Demidov, 1st Prince of San Donato, Paris, April 18, 1868 (55,000 francs). Narischkine, Paris, April 5, 1883, No. 29 (51,000 francs, Beurnonville). Baron de Beurnonville, Paris, June 3, 1884 (41,000 francs, bought in). Baron de Beurnonville, Paris, January 29, 1885 (25,000 francs, R. Kann). In the collection of Rodolphe Kann, Paris. In the collection of the late H. O. Havemeyer, New York."

Though the painting is positioned as if she is looking towards a pendant sitter, her portrait could have been painted for a hofje or some other institution to remember her by, after her death. Another version by Backer of the same woman is in the Gemäldegalerie. Since that painting has yet to be recovered after WWII, it is assumed lost. Other details may give clues, such as the black band may be a sign of mourning and the small wrist collars could mean the Mennonite faith.

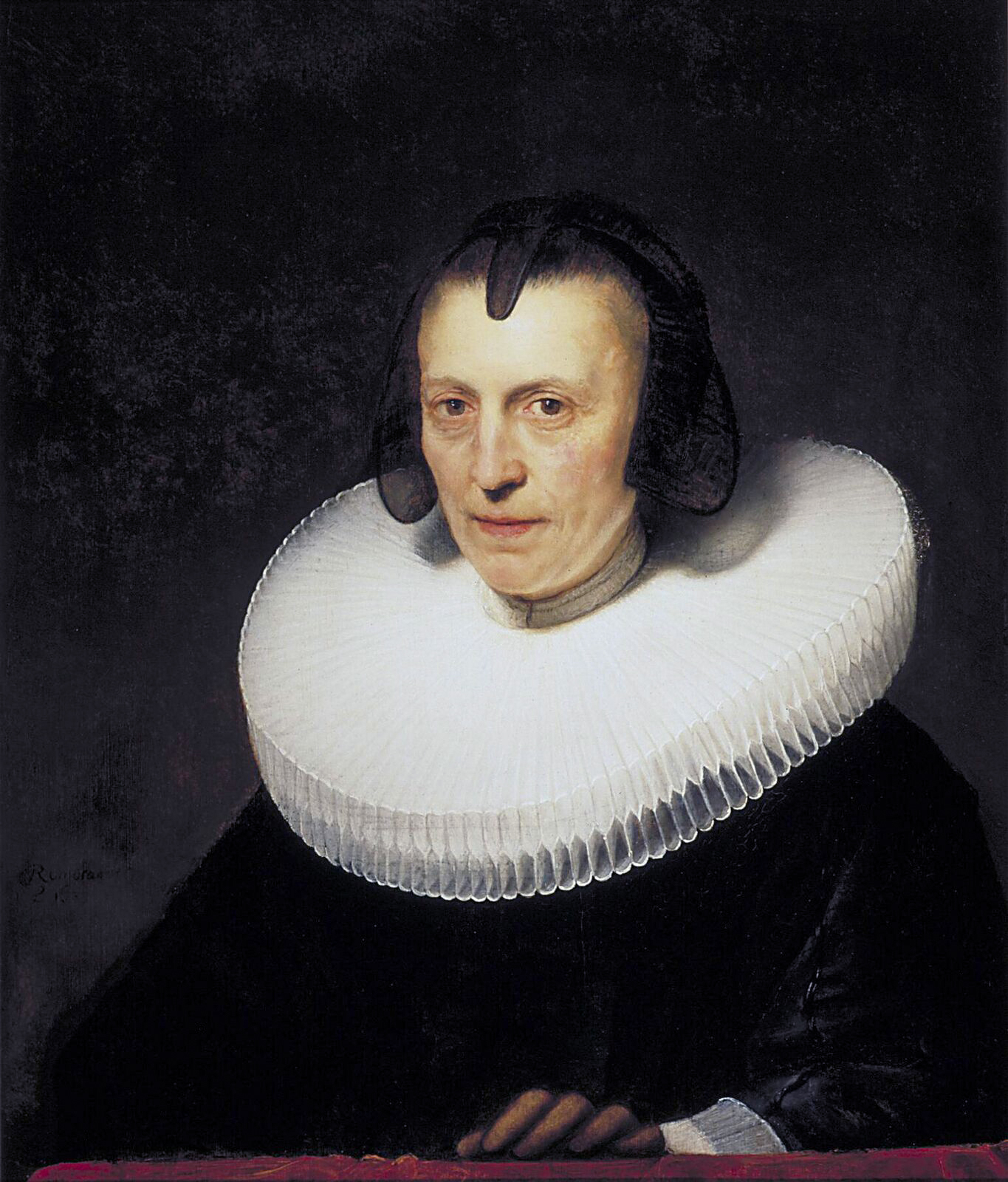
Portrait of Aletta Adriaensdr. (1589, Dordrecht - 1656, Amsterdam), dated 1639 by Rembrandt

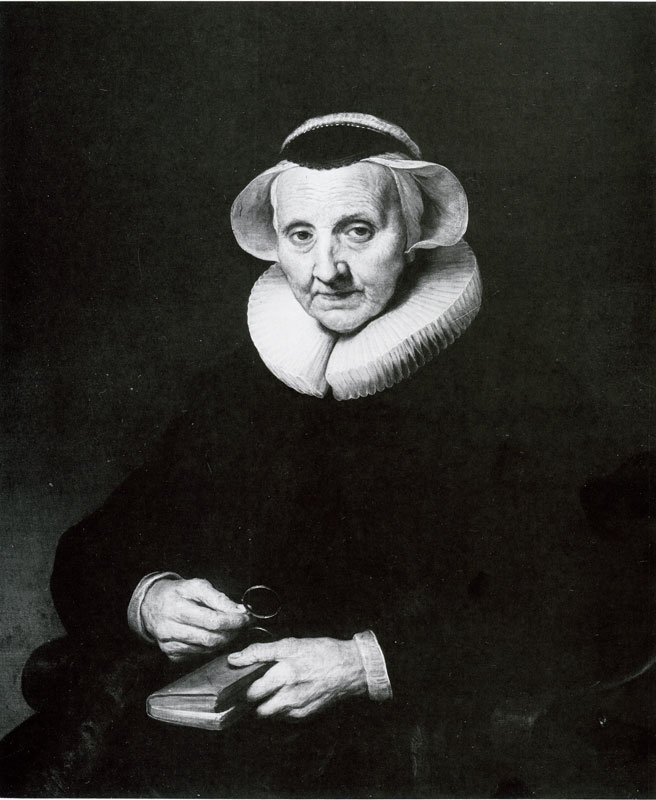
Portrait of the same woman by Backer in the Gemäldegalerie

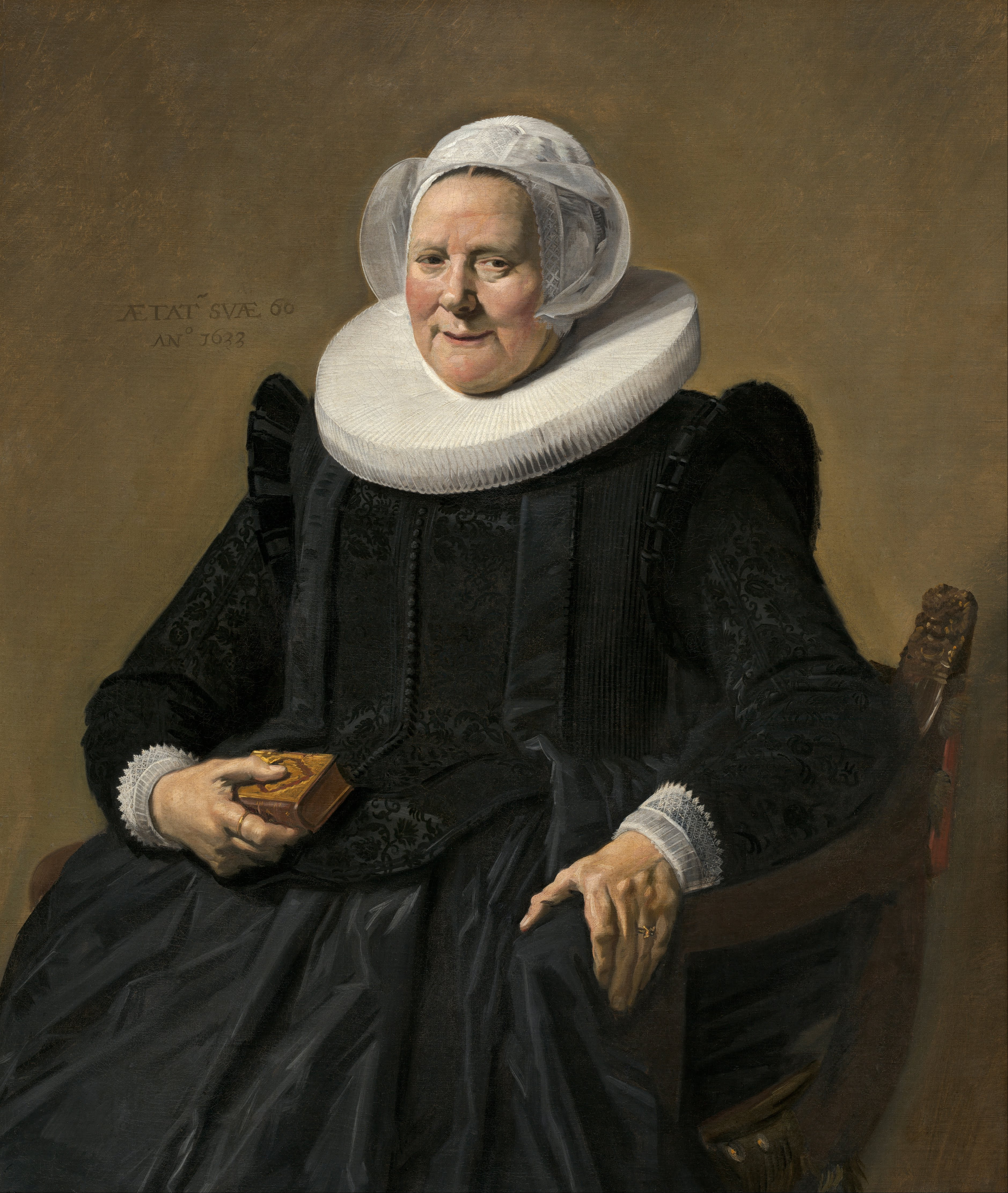
Portrait of a Woman, dated 1633 by Frans Hals

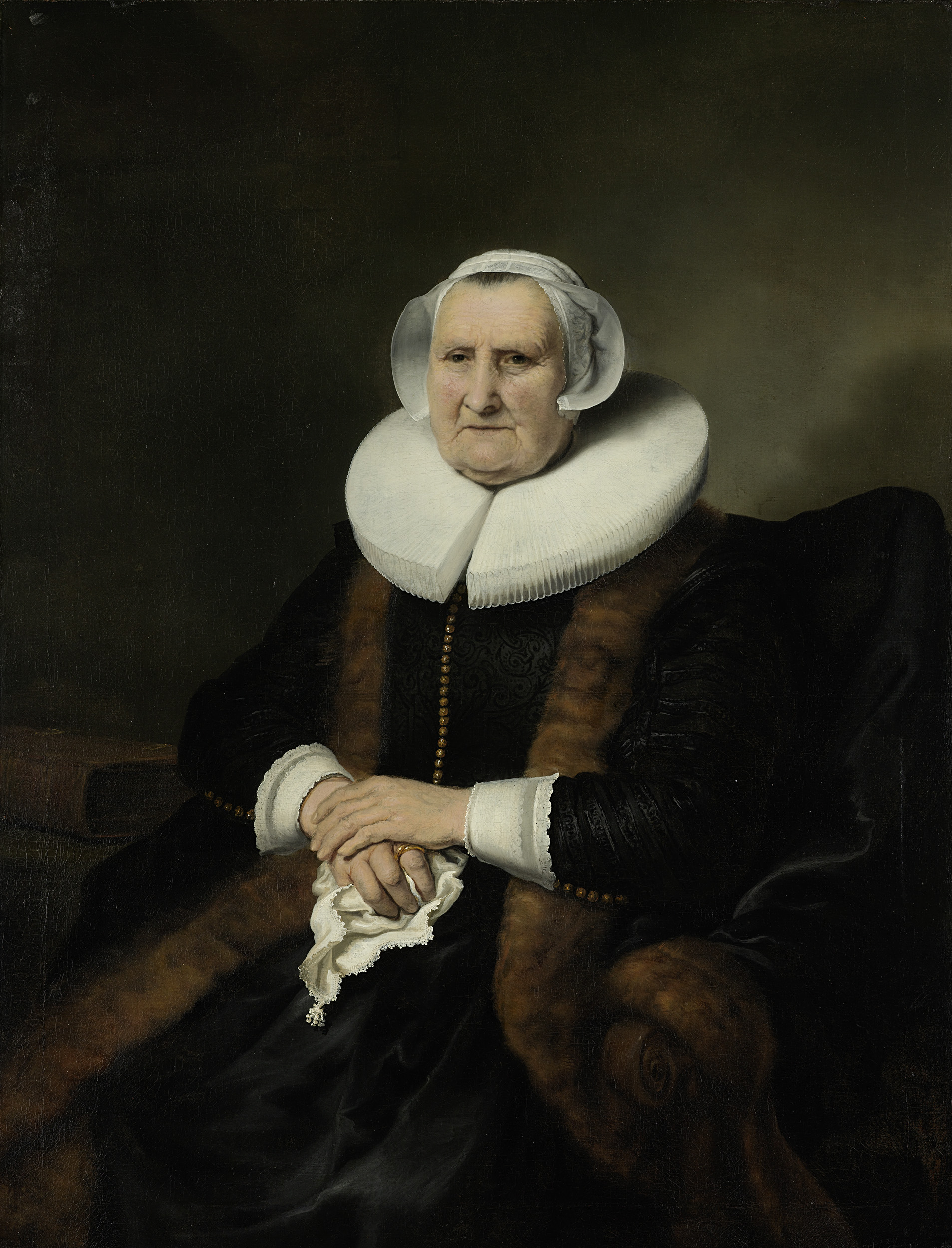
Portrait of Elisabeth Bas, circa 1640-45 by Ferdinand Bol

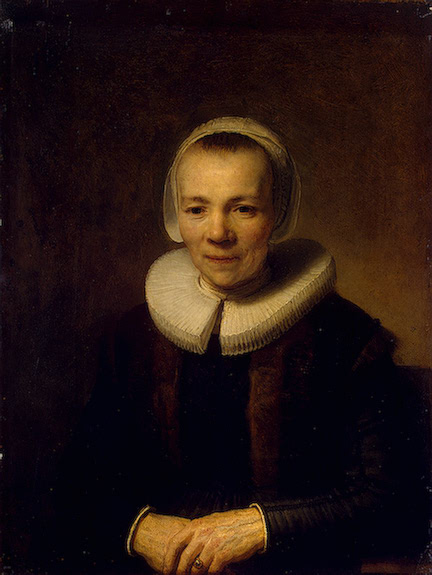
Portrait of Baertje Doomer, circa 1640 by Rembrandt
