= Louisine Havemeyer =

American art collector (1855–1929)

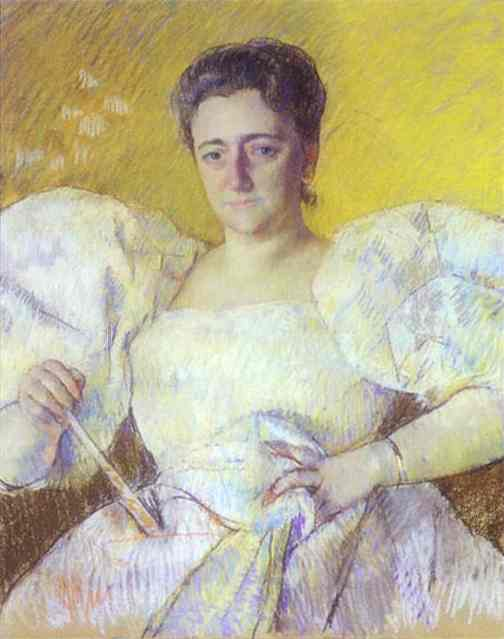
- Portrait of Havemeyer by Mary Cassatt
- Born: Louisine Waldron Elder; July 28, 1855; New York, New York
- Died: January 6, 1929 (aged 73); New York, New York
- Occupations: Philanthropist, Suffragist
- Spouse: Henry Osborne Havemeyer (m. 1883)

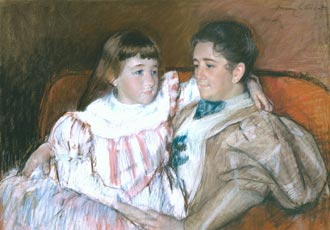
Louisine Havemeyer and her Daughter Electra, 1895 pastel on paper by Mary Cassatt. Collection of Shelburne Museum

Louisine Waldron Elder Havemeyer (July 28, 1855 – January 6, 1929) was an art collector, feminist, and philanthropist. In addition to being a patron of impressionist art, she was one of the more prominent contributors to the suffrage movement in the United States. The impressionist painter Edgar Degas and feminist Alice Paul were among the renowned recipients of this benefactor's support.

== Background ==
Louisine Waldron Elder was born in New York City on July 28, 1855, to a merchant George W. Elder (1831–1873) and his wife, Matilda Adelaide Waldron (1834–1907). She was the second of four children: Anne Eliza Elder, later Mrs. Henry Norcross Munn (1853–1917), Adaline Deliverance Mapes Elder, later Mrs. Samuel Twyford Peters (1859–1943), and brother George Waldron Elder (1860–1916).

=== Life in Paris ===
Shortly after her father's death, Louisine Elder and her family travelled to Europe for a three-year stay. They set sail on May 25, 1873, aboard the S.S. Calabria, accompanied by their extended family, aunt Amanda McCready and family, and cousin Mary Mapes Dodge, the editor of St. Nicholas Magazine and author of Hans Brinker; or the Silver Skates. Mary Mapes Dodge's sister Sophie Mapes Tolles was living in Paris with her friend Emily Sartain, studying art in the atelier of Evariste Luminais and boarding in the pensionnat of Mme. Del Sarte, widow of François Del Sarte, famed teacher of the art of expression. Louisine and her sister Addie joined Sophie Mapes Tolles and Emily Sartain in boarding at Mme. Del Sarte's, and it was during this time that Sartain introduced Louisine to Mary Cassatt. Fellow Philadelphians, Cassatt and Sartain had studied together at the Pennsylvania Academy of Fine Arts in the early 1860s and travelled to Europe together in the fall of 1871. During this time, Mary Cassatt took Louisine Elder under her wing, becoming a mentor and encouraging her to make her first art acquisition, a pastel by Edgar Degas. As time passed, particularly after Louisine married Henry O. Havemeyer, Cassatt became an advisor to the Havemeyers, helping to build their art collection and facilitating the working relationship which they would have with the Impressionist Artists, including Edgar Degas, Édouard Manet, Camille Pissarro and Claude Monet. A lifelong friendship developed between Louisine Havemeyer and Mary Cassatt, who later made several pastels of Louisine and her children.

=== Art collection ===
Together with her husband, Louisine built one of the finest art collections in America. Her three-story mansion at Fifth Avenue and East 66th Street in New York was filled with works by Manet, El Greco, Rembrandt, and Corot. The home was decorated 1889-1890 by Louis Comfort Tiffany and Samuel Colman, who made it an elegant showplace for their patron's collections. Henry Clay Frick, J.P. Morgan, and Mrs. Isabella Stewart Gardner were among the collectors with which Mr. and Mrs. Havemeyer would have known and competed.

=== Family life ===
On August 22, 1883, a decade after her father's death, Louisine married Henry O. Havemeyer of the American Sugar Refining Company.*

Louisine and Henry Osborne had three children:

- Adaline Havemeyer, a.k.a. Mrs. Peter H.B. Frelinghuysen — (1884–1963)
- Horace Havemeyer — (1886–1956)
- Electra Havemeyer, a.k.a. Mrs. James Watson Webb — (1888–1960)

* (Prior to his marriage to Louisine, Henry had been married to Louisine's aunt Mary Louise Elder (1847–1897), but that marriage ended in divorce.)

== Legacy ==
In addition to her standing as an early and important collector of Impressionist art, Louisine Havemeyer was an advocate of women's rights.

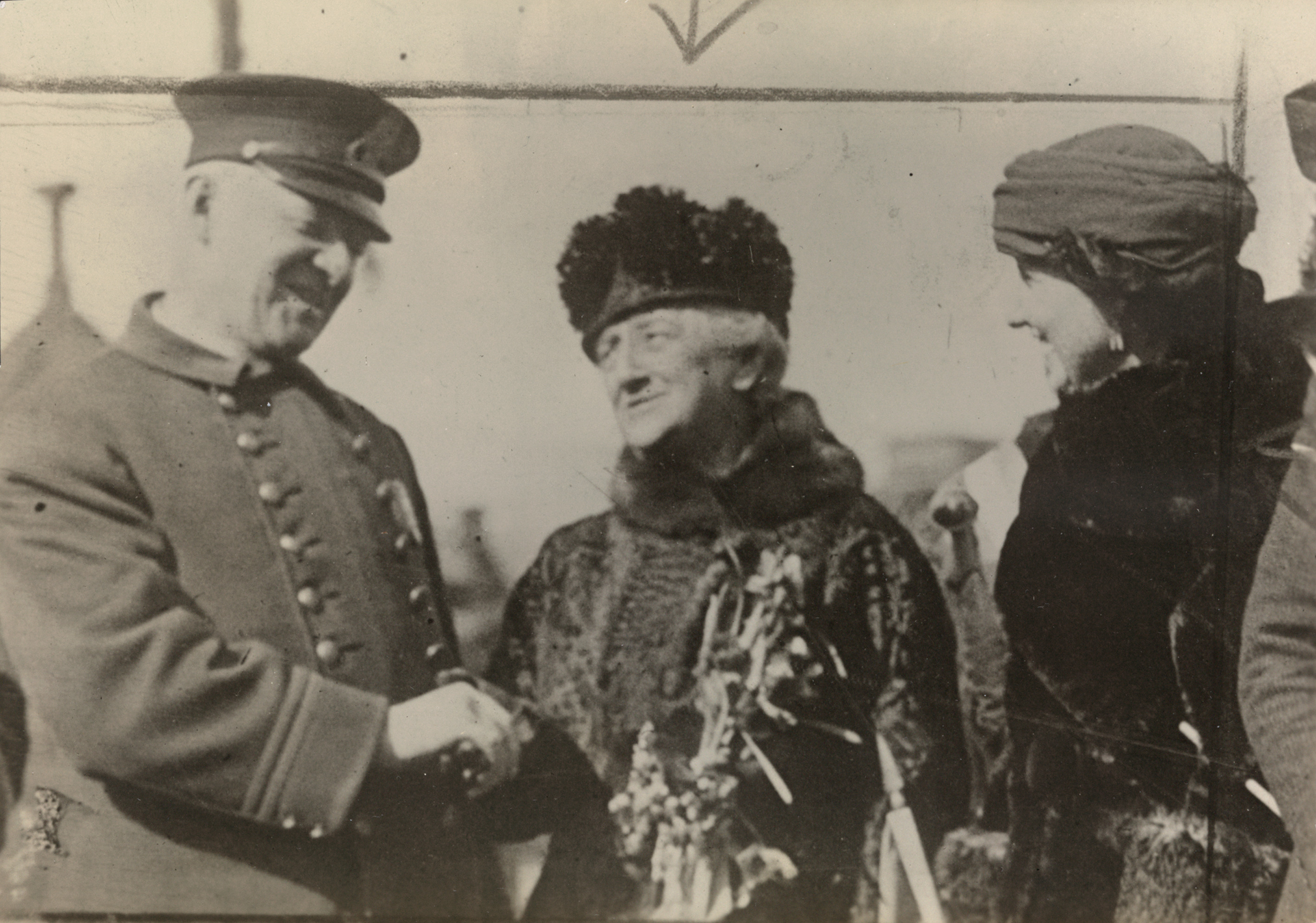
Policeman in Syracuse welcoming Louisine Havemeyer on the arrival of the Prison Special in 1919.

=== Suffrage activist ===
After her husband's death in 1907, Mrs. Havemeyer focused her attention on the women's suffrage movement. In 1912 she lent her artistic collection to Knoedler's Gallery in New York to raise money for the cause. In 1913, she founded the National Woman's Party with the radical suffragist Alice Paul. (The organization was previously known as the "Congressional Union for Woman Suffrage".) She repeated the money raising art exhibition at Knoedler's in 1915.

With the financial backing of Mrs. Havemeyer and others like her, Ms. Paul launched an increasingly confrontational series of protests that agitated for the right to vote. Paul's most famous efforts were the 1913 National Suffrage Parade, which produced a riot on the eve of President Woodrow Wilson's first inauguration and, as a member of the Silent Sentinels, the wartime picketing of the White House. During the latter, Paul used portions of the President's speeches heralding the defense of democracy in Europe which she masterfully contrasted with the denial of liberty to American women. When jailed for obstructing traffic in 1917, she hunger struck, bringing tremendous pressure to bear on the Congress and Wilson Administration. The Nineteenth Amendment, which extended voting rights to women, was debated by Congress, gained the necessary 2/3 votes in 1919, was sent to the states for ratification, and gained the necessary 3/4 of states ratifying in 1920.

Louisine Havemeyer became a well-known suffragist, publishing two articles about her work for the cause in Scribner's Magazine. The first, entitled "The Prison Special: Memories of a Militant", appeared in May 1922, and the other, "The Suffrage Torch: Memories of a Militant" appeared in June the same year. In 1912 and 1915, Mrs. Havemeyer organized exhibitions of art works from her collection at Knoedler Gallery to raise funds to support suffrage efforts. She participated in marches, much to the dismay of her children, down New York's famed Fifth Avenue and addressed a standing room only audience at Carnegie Hall upon the completion of a nationwide speaking tour. A famous photograph of Mrs. Havemeyer shows her with an electric torch, similar in design to that of the Statue of Liberty, among other prominent suffragists. Her attempt to burn an effigy of President Wilson outside the White House in 1919 drew national attention.

After a period of failing health, Mrs. Havemeyer died in 1929. Mrs. Havemeyer is interred at Green-Wood Cemetery in Brooklyn, New York. The terms of her will left a few choice paintings to the Metropolitan Museum of Art in New York City. The final bequest, made possible by the generosity of her children, included nearly two-thousand works that enrich nearly every segment of the museum's collections.

Many Tiffany pieces from her Fifth Avenue home, including a magnificent peacock mantelpiece decoration, and a chandelier are on permanent display at the University of Michigan Museum of Art. A portion of the Music Room furniture suite is on view at the Shelburne Museum.

=== Family legacy ===
Louisine's children would continue to build upon their family's legacy as art collectors. Louisine's daughter Electra Havemeyer Webb collected American fine and folk paintings and sculpture that helped to found the Shelburne Museum. The museum showcases a "collection of collections" in fine examples of early American homes and public buildings; a general store, meeting house, log cabin, and even a steamship dot the grounds. Her great-grandson, John Wilmerding, is a well known professor of art, collector, and curator, and is best known as a prolific author of books on American art. Her daughter Adaline and son Horace Havemeyer, and grandsons Horace Havemeyer, Jr. and Harry W. Havemeyer bequeathed several works from Vermeer, Goya, Corot, Manet, and others to the National Gallery of Art.

=== Paintings bequeathed to the Metropolitan Museum of Art ===
| image | title | painter | date | accession number | The Met url |
|---|---|---|---|---|---|
| | Portrait of Herman Doomer | Rembrandt | 1640 | 29.100.1 | MET |
| | Portrait of an Old Woman | Jacob Adriaensz Backer | 1640s | 29.100.2 | MET |
| | Portrait of a Man, probably a Member of the Van Beresteyn Family | Rembrandt | 1632 | 29.100.3 | MET |
| | Portrait of a Woman, probably a Member of the Van Beresteyn Family | Rembrandt | 1632 | 29.100.4 | MET |
| | Cardinal Fernando Niño de Guevara | El Greco | 1600 | 29.100.5 | MET |
| | View of Toledo | El Greco | 1596 | 29.100.6 | MET |
| | The Visit | Pieter de Hooch | 1657 | 29.100.7 | MET |
| | Portrait of Petrus Scriverius | Frans Hals | 1626 | 29.100.8 | MET |
| | Portrait of Anna van der Aar | Frans Hals | 1626 | 29.100.9 | MET |
| | Majas on a Balcony | Francisco de Goya | 1808 | 29.100.10 | MET |
| | María Luisa of Parma (1751–1819), Queen of Spain | Copy after Goya | 1900s | 29.100.11 | MET |
| | A City on a Rock | Style of Goya | 1900s | 29.100.12 | MET |
| | Saint Cecilia | Abraham van Diepenbeeck | 1700s | 29.100.14 | MET |
| | Portrait of a Man | Hugo van der Goes | | 29.100.15 | MET |
| | Portrait of a Young Man with a Book | Bronzino | 1540 | 29.100.16 | MET |
| | Madonna and Child with Two Angels | Botticelli | 1500s | 29.100.17 | MET |
| | The Burning of Sodom | Jean-Baptiste Camille Corot | 1850s | 29.100.18 | MET |
| | Bacchante by the Sea | Jean-Baptiste Camille Corot | 1860; 1865 | 29.100.19 | MET |
| | Orpheus and Eurydice | painting in the manner of Nicolas Poussin | | 29.100.20 | MET |
| | Mercury and Battus | Francisque Millet | | 29.100.21 | MET |
| | Portrait of a Man | Corneille de Lyon | 1540 | 29.100.22 | MET |
| | Joseph-Antoine Moltedo | Jean Auguste Dominique Ingres | 1810 | 29.100.23 | MET |
| | Portrait of a Man with a Rosary | Lucas Cranach the Elder | | 29.100.24 | MET |
| | Dancers Practicing at the Barre | Edgar Degas | 1877 | 29.100.34 | MET |
| | Woman Having Her Hair Combed | Edgar Degas | | 29.100.35 | MET |
| | Woman Drying Her Foot | Edgar Degas | | 29.100.36 | MET |
| | Woman with a Towel | Edgar Degas | | 29.100.37 | MET |
| | At the Milliner's | Edgar Degas | 1882 | 29.100.38 | MET |
| | The Rehearsal Onstage | Edgar Degas | 1874 | 29.100.39 | MET |
| | The Artist's Cousin, Probably Mrs. William Bell (Mathilde Musson, 1841–1878) | Edgar Degas | 1873 | 29.100.40 | MET |
| | Woman Bathing in a Shallow Tub | Edgar Degas | 1885 | 29.100.41 | MET |
| | Dancers, Pink and Green | Edgar Degas | | 29.100.42 | MET |
| | Sulking | Edgar Degas | | 29.100.43 | MET |
| | The Collector of Prints | Edgar Degas | 1866 | 29.100.44 | MET |
| | Madame Théodore Gobillard (Yves Morisot, 1838–1893) | Edgar Degas | 1869 | 29.100.45 | MET |
| | A Woman Ironing | Edgar Degas | 1873 | 29.100.46 | MET |
| | Mother and Child (The Oval Mirror) | Mary Cassatt | | 29.100.47 | MET |
| | Young Mother Sewing | Mary Cassatt | 1900 | 29.100.48 | MET |
| | The Dead Christ with Angels | Édouard Manet | 1864 | 29.100.51 | MET |
| | A Matador | Édouard Manet | 1866; 1867 | 29.100.52 | MET |
| | Mademoiselle V. . . in the Costume of an Espada | Édouard Manet | 1862 | 29.100.53 | MET |
| | Young man in Mayo costume | Édouard Manet | 1863 | 29.100.54 | MET |
| | George Moore (1852–1933) | Édouard Manet | | 29.100.55 | MET |
| | Mademoiselle Isabelle Lemonnier (1857–1926) | Édouard Manet | | 29.100.56 | MET |
| | Woman with a Parrot | Gustave Courbet | 1866 | 29.100.57 | MET |
| | The Source | Gustave Courbet | 1862 | 29.100.58 | MET |
| | Woman in a Riding Habit (L'Amazone) | Gustave Courbet | 1856 | 29.100.59 | MET |
| | Nude with Flowering Branch | Gustave Courbet | 1863 | 29.100.60 | MET |
| | After the Hunt | Gustave Courbet | | 29.100.61 | MET |
| | The Woman in the Waves | Gustave Courbet | 1868 | 29.100.62 | MET |
| | Jo, La Belle Irlandaise | Gustave Courbet | | 29.100.63 | MET |
| | Mont Sainte-Victoire and the Viaduct of the Arc River Valley | Paul Cézanne | 1882 | 29.100.64 | MET |
| | Gustave Boyer (b. 1840) in a Straw Hat | Paul Cézanne | | 29.100.65 | MET |
| | Still Life with Jar, Cup, and Apples | Paul Cézanne | 1877s | 29.100.66 | MET |
| | The Gulf of Marseilles Seen from L'Estaque | Paul Cézanne | 1885 | 29.100.67 | MET |
| | Portrait of a Man with a Breastplate and Plumed Hat | Rembrandt | 1640s | 29.100.102 | MET |
| | Portrait of a Woman | Rembrandt; Ferdinand Bol; Jan Victors | 1640s | 29.100.103 | MET |
| | Portrait of a Woman | Francesco Montemezzano | | 29.100.104 | MET |
| | Boy with a Greyhound | Paolo Veronese | | 29.100.105 | MET |
| | Chrysanthemums | Claude Monet | 1882 | 29.100.106 | MET |
| | Bouquet of Sunflowers | Claude Monet | 1881 | 29.100.107 | MET |
| | Ice Floes | Claude Monet | 1893 | 29.100.108 | MET |
| | Haystacks (Effect of Snow and Sun) | Claude Monet | 1891 | 29.100.109 | MET |
| | The Four Trees | Claude Monet | 1891 | 29.100.110 | MET |
| | The Green Wave | Claude Monet | | 29.100.111 | MET |
| | La Grenouillère | Claude Monet | 1869 | 29.100.112 | MET |
| | Bridge over a Pond of Water Lilies | Claude Monet | 1899 | 29.100.113 | MET |
| | Copy after Delacroix's "Bark of Dante" | Édouard Manet | | 29.100.114 | MET |
| | Boating | Édouard Manet | 1874 | 29.100.115 | MET |
| | The Allegory of the Sorbonne | Pierre Puvis de Chavannes | 1889 | 29.100.117 | MET |
| | Madame de Brayer | Gustave Courbet | 1858 | 29.100.118 | MET |
| | Portrait of a Woman, Called Héloïse Abélard | Style of Gustave Courbet | 1900s | 29.100.119 | MET |
| | Charles Suisse | Gustave Courbet | 1861 | 29.100.120 | MET |
| | Spring Flowers | Copy after Gustave Courbet | 1855 | 29.100.121 | MET |
| | The Source of the Loue | Gustave Courbet | 1864 | 29.100.122 | MET |
| | Apples | painting in the style of Gustave Courbet | 1900s | 29.100.123 | MET |
| | The Young Bather | Gustave Courbet | 1866 | 29.100.124 | MET |
| | By the Seashore | Pierre-Auguste Renoir | 1883 | 29.100.125 | MET |
| | Bather in the Woods | Camille Pissarro | 1895 | 29.100.126 | MET |
| | Dancers in the Rehearsal Room with a Double Bass | Edgar Degas | | 29.100.127 | MET |
| | A Woman Seated beside a Vase of Flowers | Edgar Degas | 1865 | 29.100.128 | MET |
| | The Third-Class Carriage | Honoré Daumier | 1862 | 29.100.129 | MET |
| | Madame Auguste Cuoq (Mathilde Desportes, 1827–1910) | Gustave Courbet | | 29.100.130 | MET |
| | Christ Asleep during the Tempest | Eugène Delacroix | | 29.100.131 | MET |
| | Alphonse Promayet (1822–1872) | Gustave Courbet | 1851 | 29.100.132 | MET |
| | Portrait of a Man | Gaspare Traversi | 1800s | 29.100.179 | MET |
| | Narcisa Barañana de Goicoechea | Francisco de Goya y Lucientes | 1815 | 29.100.180 | MET |
| | Joseph-Henri Altès (1826–1895) | Edgar Degas | 1868 | 29.100.181 | MET |
| | Marie Dihau (1843–1935) | Edgar Degas | | 29.100.182 | MET |
| | Portrait of a Young Woman | Edgar Degas | | 29.100.183 | MET |
| | The Dancing Class | Edgar Degas | 1870s | 29.100.184 | MET |
| | Woman on a Sofa | Edgar Degas | 1875 | 29.100.185 | MET |
| | Two Dancers | Edgar Degas | 1873 | 29.100.187 | MET |
| | Dancer with a Fan | Edgar Degas | | 29.100.188 | MET |
| | Two Dancers | Edgar Degas | | 29.100.189 | MET |
| | Bather Stepping into a Tub | Edgar Degas | | 29.100.190 | MET |
| | The Muse: History | Jean-Baptiste Camille Corot | 1865 | 29.100.193 | MET |
| | Rocks in the Forest | Paul Cézanne | | 29.100.194 | MET |
| | The Experts | Alexandre-Gabriel Decamps | 1837 | 29.100.196 | MET |
| | Anne de Pisseleu (1508–1576), Duchesse d'Étampes | Corneille de Lyon | | 29.100.197 | MET |
| | Man with a Tankard | Style of Adriaen van Ostade | 1700s | 29.100.198 | MET |
| | The Connoisseur | Honoré Daumier | 1862s | 29.100.200 | MET |
| | Portrait of a Man | Gustave Courbet | | 29.100.201 | MET |
| | The Ballet from "Robert le Diable" | Edgar Degas | 1871 | 29.100.552 | MET |
| | Woman Drying Her Arm | Edgar Degas | | 29.100.553 | MET |
| | Fan Mount: The Ballet | Edgar Degas | 1879 | 29.100.554 | MET |
| | Fan Mount: Ballet Girls | Edgar Degas | 1879 | 29.100.555 | MET |
| | Russian Dancer | Edgar Degas | 1899 | 29.100.556 | MET |
| | Dancer with a Fan | Edgar Degas | | 29.100.557 | MET |
| | Three Dancers Preparing for Class | Edgar Degas | | 29.100.558 | MET |
| | Mademoiselle Lucie Delabigne (1859–1910), Called Valtesse de la Bigne | Édouard Manet | 1879 | 29.100.561 | MET |
| | Girl Weaving a Garland | Jean-Baptiste Camille Corot | | 29.100.562 | MET |
| | Reverie | Jean-Baptiste Camille Corot | | 29.100.563 | MET |
| | Portrait of a Child | Jean-Baptiste Camille Corot | | 29.100.564 | MET |
| | Sibylle | Jean-Baptiste Camille Corot | 1870s | 29.100.565 | MET |
| | The Calm Sea | Gustave Courbet | 1869 | 29.100.566 | MET |
| | Bacchante in a Landscape | Jean-Baptiste Camille Corot | 1865 | 29.100.598 | MET |

== See also ==
- Havemeyer

== Resources ==
- Louisine Havemeyer.1993. Sixteen to Sixty: Memoirs of a Collector. New York: Ursus Press. ISBN 978-1-883145-00-2
- Louisine W. Havemeyer. 1922. The Suffrage Torch: Memories of a Militant Scribners (May), pp. 528–538.
- Louisine W. Havemeyer. 1922. The Prison Special: Memories of a Militant Scribners (June) pp. 661–675.
- Alice Cooney Frelinghuysen. 1993. Splendid Legacy: The Havemeyer Collection New York: Metropolitan Museum of Art. ISBN 978-0-8109-6426-6
