= The Improvised Field Hospital =

Painting by Frédéric Bazille

- Portraits of the Family
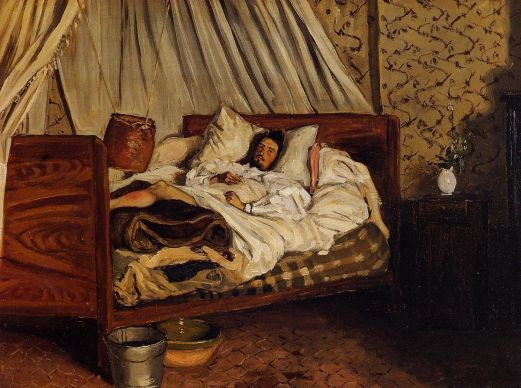
- Artist: Frédéric Bazille
- Year: 1865
- Medium: oil on canvas
- Dimensions: 48 cm × 65 cm (19 in × 26 in)
- Location: Musée d'Orsay; Paris

The Improvised Field Hospital (French - L'ambulance improvisée) or Monet after His Accident at the Inn of Chailly is an oil-on-canvas painting created in 1865 by the French painter Frédéric Bazille. It shows Claude Monet in bed recovering from a leg injury he had sustained in summer 1865, in Chailly-en-Bière, small village just on the outskirts of the forest of Fontainebleau. The work has been in the Musée d'Orsay in Paris since 1986.

The Musée d'Orsay notes of the painting, "Bazille, whose work falls between Courbet's Realism and a nascent Impressionism, renders the event in every detail. On the untidy bed one can clearly see the red, inflamed wound on Monet's shin, while his face expresses his despondency at being immobilised in this way. The intimacy of the scene demonstrates the bonds of friendship between the two men."

== See also ==
- List of paintings by Frédéric Bazille
- A Studio at Les Batignolles, 1870 painting by Henri Fantin-Latour
- Claude Monet Painting in His Garden at Argenteuil, 1873 painting by Pierre-Auguste Renoir
- Claude Monet Painting in his Studio, 1874 painting by Édouard Manet
- Portrait of the painter Claude Monet, 1875 painting by Renoir
