= Claude Monet Painting in his Studio =

1874 painting by Édouard Manet

Claude Monet painting in his studio boat
- Monet on his boat
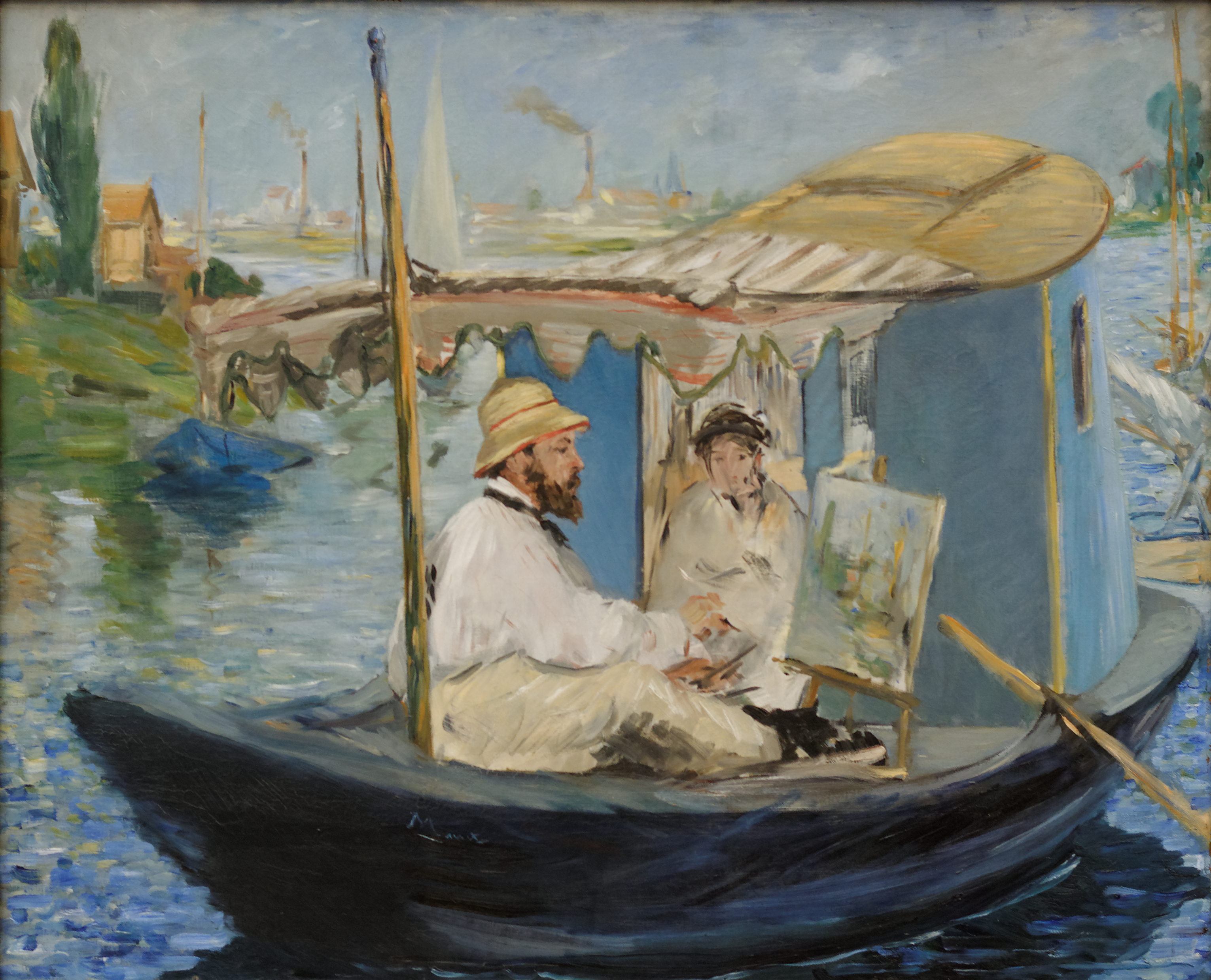
- Year: 1874
- Dimensions: 82.7 cm (32.6 in) × 105.0 cm (41.3 in)
- Collection: Bavarian State Painting Collections
- Identifiers: Bildindex der Kunst und Architektur ID: 00060135

Claude Monet Painting in his Studio or Monet in his Boat is an 1874 oil on canvas painting by Édouard Manet. It shows his friend Claude Monet painting in his 'studio-boat' with his wife. This was an old boat Monet had bought around 1871 or 1872, from which he observed the light on the Seine – Daubigny also had a studio-boat called the Bottin. With The Monet Family in their Garden and Argenteuil, it was one of a number of paintings produced during a summer Manet spent with Monet. The work is now in the Neue Pinakothek in Munich.

== See also ==
- List of paintings by Édouard Manet
- The Improvised Field Hospital, 1865 painting by Frédéric Bazille
- A Studio at Les Batignolles, 1870 painting by Henri Fantin-Latour
- Claude Monet Painting in His Garden at Argenteuil, 1873 painting by Pierre-Auguste Renoir
- Portrait of the painter Claude Monet, 1875 painting by Renoir
- The museum's Catalogue entry
- 1874 in art
