= Le Bien Public =

French regional daily newspaper

Le Bien Public is a regional daily newspaper published in Dijon in north-east France.

== History and profile ==
Le Bien Public was established in 1868. The paper is published by Groupe EBRA. The daily had a circulation of 52,200 copies in 1990 and 51,500 copies in 1992. The daily had a circulation of 35,179 copies in 2020.

Yearly circulation. Source: OJD/ACPM
Année	Diffusion totale
2018	37,745
2017	38,663
2016	38,480
2015	38,672
2014	39,587
