= Havemeyer =

Havemeyer is a German surname. It may refer to the Havemeyer family. Notable persons with that name include:

- Arthur Havemeyer (1882–1955), American golfer
- Electra Havemeyer Webb (1888–1960), American antiques collector
- Camilla Woodward Moss Havemeyer (1869–1934), American socialite
- Charles Frederick Havemeyer (1867–1898), American socialite
- Henry Osborne Havemeyer (1847–1907), American sugar manufacturer
- Loomis Havemeyer (1886–1971), American author and professor
- Louisine Havemeyer (1855–1929), American art collector, suffragist, philanthropist
- Theodore Havemeyer (1839–1897), American sugar manufacturer and golf administrator
- William Frederick Havemeyer (1804–1874), American businessman and politician
