= John Northrop =

John Northrop may refer to:

- John Howard Northrop (1891–1987), biochemist
- John Isaiah Northrop (1861–1891), zoologist
- Jack Northrop (John Knudsen Northrop, 1895–1981), American aircraft industrialist and designer who founded the Northrop Corporation
