= William Butler Duncan Sr. =

William Butler Duncan Sr. may refer to:

- W. Butler Duncan I (1830–1912), a Scottish-American banker and railroad executive, the uncle and adoptive father of William Butler Duncan II
- William Butler Duncan II (1862–1933), a leader in American yacht racing and naval service, father of William Butler Duncan III
