= Aurelian Honor Society =

Secret society at Yale University, US

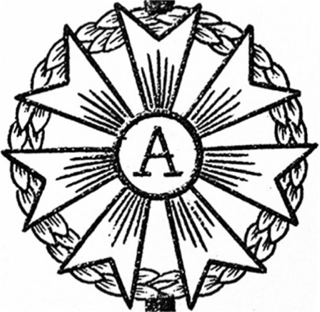
- Founded: 1910; 116 years ago Yale University
- Type: Senior society
- Affiliation: Independent
- Status: Active
- Scope: Local
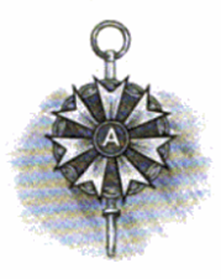
- Member badge
- Chapters: 1
- Nickname: Aurelian
- Headquarters: Sterling Sheffield Strathcona Hall; New Haven, Connecticut; United States
- Website: aurelianhonorsociety.org

Established in 1910, the Aurelian Honor Society ("Aurelian") is the fifth oldest landed secret society at Yale University in New Haven, Connecticut. It was founded in 1910. In addition, Aurelian is part of a four-society "Consortium" with Manuscript Society, Book and Snake, and Berzelius.

Contemporary membership is based on an election process coordinated by the incumbent delegation. Aurelian selects sixteen prominent members of the Junior class to join the society annually.

== History ==
At the beginning of the 20th century, Yale University had two separate undergraduate colleges, each with separate facilities, administrations, and student bodies. One of these, the Sheffield Scientific School, suffered from student divisiveness due to an active Greek system that separated fraternities from each other, and those who were not in fraternities from those who were. In the spring of 1910, Lindell T. Bates and Loomis Havemeyer, recognizing the fragmentation of the student body and lack of unified leadership, founded the Aurelian Honor Society for seniors "who would not labor under unnecessary handicaps which separated the existing clubs from the student body". Membership in this society was offered to outstanding "Sheff" students of good scholarship and extracurricular achievement. In addition, the society was to elect three honorary members annually.

The purpose of this non-secret organization was to formulate mature undergraduate opinions on those matters affecting the vital interests of the Sheffield Scientific School, both internally and in its relations with the rest of the university. The first official meeting was held on June 6, 1910. The minutes from this meeting and subsequent meetings are collected in books in The Rooms, the society's headquarters. At each meeting, a paper was read by a member on issues of undergraduate life. These papers have been collected and preserved by the society's historian and can now be found locked in a large safe that safeguards other treasures of the organization.

Membership in Aurelian originally did not preclude membership in a senior society but rather supplemented it, bringing together the best people from various fields to promote the high ideals of service to the university. A quote from the Yale Daily News of April 29, 1933, read: "The Aurelian Honor Society aims to promote contact and communication between members, to exert an organized force for cooperation with the administration and helpfully to consider problems affecting the University." At the 25th anniversary of Aurelian, the president of Yale said that the society had reached a foremost position at Yale through its years of unceasing work to help solve administrative, educational, and social problems. In recognition, the university gave Aurelian its luxurious quarters when "The Rooms" were constructed in 1932.

In 1935, the society voted to give the university $250 to make a film of Life at Yale to be sent to alumni meetings throughout the country. The society also enjoyed many social activities: supper parties in The Rooms, graduate teas after the big games in the fall, a luncheon on Class Day for graduates and their families, and occasional theater and athletic events.

Besides discussing issues of the university, Aurelian has, since its inception, overseen a variety of important philanthropic activities in support of the university: a scholarship fund (in place since 1953 administered by the financial aid office), an undergraduate science contest, the Chester Harding Plimpton award ($100 in gold and the bas-relief medal, the original medal once hung on the wall in The Rooms), a public lecture series, and the prep-school cup award (predecessor to the present book awards). In 1953, Loomis Havemeyer and fellow trustees established the Aurelian Honor Society, Inc. as a charitable foundation 501(c)3 to preserve and further the established principles of the honor society and, through stewardship of donated funds, provide a university scholarship, academic prizes in Yale’s name and support for the undergraduate society of the same name. It holds one of the largest endowments amongst societies at Yale.

After the unification of Yale College and the Sheffield Scientific School, and through the tumultuous era of the 1960s, the Aurelian Honor Society's role in University governance declined. Nevertheless, Aurelian continued to be a supra-senior society, drawing its membership from throughout the university and other societies. Largely due to the sponsorship of Aurelian alumnus Loomis Havemeyer (author of the history of the society, and whose photo hangs in the main room), Aurelian continued to meet for Tuesday lunches with faculty and honorary members. When Yale went co-ed, Aurelian followed suit, making it one of the few societies to do so at their first opportunity.

In 1981, with the help of Dick Shank, then registrar of Yale College and a successor of Loomis Havemeyer, Aurelian was revived after a period of a few years in the late 1970s when all societies and fraternities were in decline. In 2009, the delegation modified the constitution, officially declaring itself a senior society and thereby formally adopting the practices of those societies such as mutual exclusivity from other societies, conducting student biographies, and participating in the tap process. Aurelian is housed in Sterling Sheffield Strathcona Hall.

== Symbols ==
The name was chosen in honor of the Roman Emperor Marcus Aurelius, whose career and philosophy represented those ideas for which the organization wished to strive.

These ideals are symbolized by the society's emblem: a seven-pointed star surrounded by a wreath. The wreath represents a reward of merit, and the star stands for a single body (originally seven members) radiating light in the seven principal lines of college activity—Scientific, Athletic, Literary, Oratorical, Executive, Scholarship, and Religious.

== Activities ==
The society hosts an annual speakers program and monthly lunches with members of the faculty and administration. Past guests of the society include four-star American general Stanley A. McChrystal and American politician Howard Dean.

The society presents the Aurelian Award annual to a graduating senior "for sterling character, high scholarship, and forceful leadership". The Aurelian Honor Society Robert H. O’Connor Scholarship is awarded each year to a Yale senior. The Aurelian Honor Society Book Prize is given annually at secondary schools across the country to students those schools consider exemplary. In addition, the society supports a participating student at the Yale Summer Bioethics Institute through the Nuland Stipend. Most recently, Aurelian has associated itself with the Yale Alumni Non-Profit Alliance (YANA).

For many years, the New York alumni invited the Aurelian undergraduates to the Yale Club for a reception. In 2010, the society hosted its 100th anniversary at the Yale Club of New York. As of the fall of 2017, Aurelian members are provided membership to the Elm City Club, which consists of the Quinnipiack Club and the Graduate Club. This includes exclusive access to The Rooms in the Quinnipiack Club, renovated and used by the society alone.

== Membership ==
Contemporary membership is based on an election process coordinated by the incumbent delegation. Aurelian selects sixteen prominent members of the Junior class to join the society annually. Members are selected based on seven criteria: athletic, educational, executive, literary, oratorical, religious, and scientific. Editors of publications such as The Yale Herald, varsity athletics captains, and other student leaders are typically well represented among Aurelian's ranks.

== Notable members ==
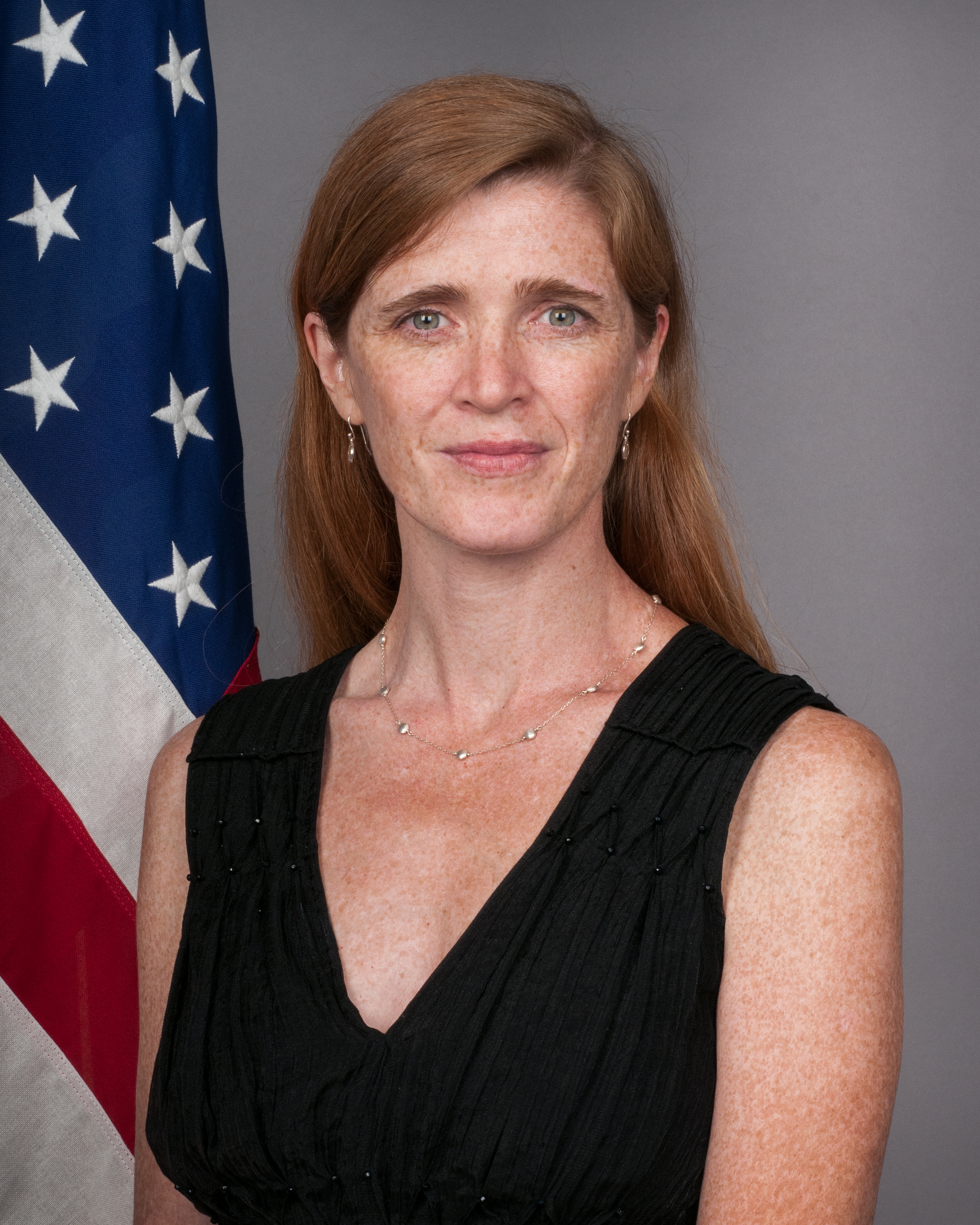
Samantha Power

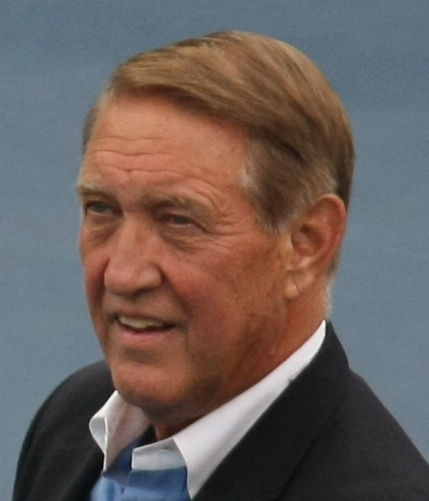
Donald Dell

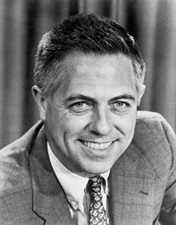
James L. Buckley

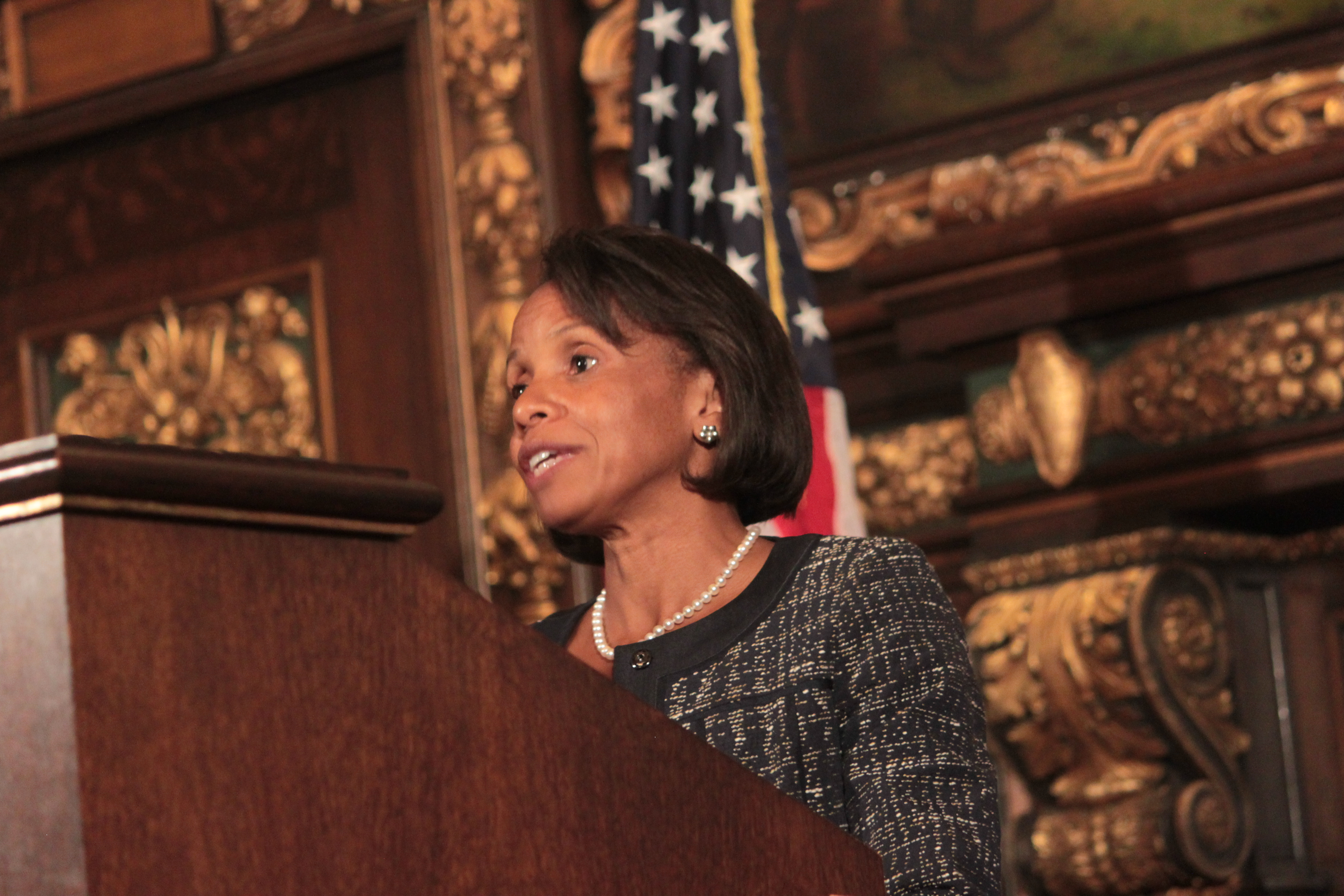
Wilhelmina Wright

Name	Yale Class	Notability	Ref.
Jim Amoss	1969	Former editor of The Times-Picayune, winner of four Pulitzer Prizes	
Victor Ashe	1967	Former United States Ambassador to Poland; former mayor of Knoxville, Tennessee	
Larry Bensky	1958	Pacifica Radio station KPFA-FM in Berkeley, California	
James L. Buckley	1944	Inactive Senior United States circuit judge of the United States Court of Appeals for the District of Columbia Circuit. Former United States Senator from the state of New York	
Sam Chauncey	1957	Longtime administrator at Yale University	
Thurston Clarke	1968	Author of JFK's Last Hundred Days: The Transformation of a Man and the Emergence of a Great President	
Donald Dell	1960	Attorney and former professional tennis player, U.S. Davis Cup captain, and member of the International Tennis Hall of Fame	
Jorge I. Domínguez	1967	Antonio Madero Professor for the Study of Mexico at Harvard University and chair of the Harvard Academy for International and Area Studies	
Virginia R. Domínguez	1971	Edward William and Jane Marr Gutgsell Professor of Anthropology at the University of Illinois at Urbana-Champaign	
Charles Duhigg	1997	Author of The Power of Habit: Why We Do What We Do in Life and Business	
R. David Edelman	2007	First Director for International Cyber Policy on the U.S. National Security Council; Director of the Project on Technology, the Economy, and National Security (TENS) at the Massachusetts Institute of Technology	
Keith Ferrazzi	1988	Founder and CEO of Ferrazzi Greenlight, a Los Angeles, California-based research and consulting firm; wrote the New York Times best-selling books Never Eat Alone and Who's Got Your Back?	
John Lewis Gaddis	Honorary	Cold War historian, political scientist, and professor of military and naval history at Yale University	
John B. Goodenough	1944	Solid-state physicist and professor of mechanical engineering and materials science at The University of Texas at Austin. Widely credited for the identification and development of the Li-ion rechargeable battery.	
Loomis Havemayer	1910	Longstanding administrator of the Sheffield Scientific School at Yale University. Founding member and preeminent historian of the Aurelian Honor Society	
Warren Hoge	1963	Journalist at The New York Times	
Reuben Jeffery III	1975	Former United States Under Secretary of State for Economic, Business, and Agricultural Affairs; President, Chief Executive Officer, and member of the board of Rockefeller & Co. and Rockefeller Financial Services, Inc.	
Robert G. Kaiser	1964	Former managing editor of The Washington Post	
Ted Landsmark	1969	President of Boston Architectural College (BAC) from 1997 to 2014	
Jacques Leslie	1968	War correspondent for the Los Angeles Times during the Vietnam War	
Lance Liebman	1962	Former Dean of Columbia Law School	
James Lindgren	1974	Professor of law at Northwestern University	
Richard Lyon	1945	The first Admiral of the United States Navy Special Warfare SEAL	
Russell W. Meyer Jr.	1954	Chairman Emeritus and former Chief Executive Officer (CEO) of the Cessna Aircraft Company	
Nicholas de Monchaux	1995	Associate Professor of Architecture and Urban Design in the College of Environmental Design at the University of California, Berkeley	
Richard Portes	1962	CBE; professor of Economics at London Business School; Founder and President of the Centre for Economic Policy Research, Rhodes Scholar	
Samantha Power	1992	United States Ambassador to the United Nations from 2013 to 2017	
Philip Proctor	1962	Member of The Firesign Theatre; Voiced Howard Deville in Rugrats and All Grown Up!	
T. K. Seung	1958	Jesse H. Jones Professor in Liberal Arts, at the University of Texas at Austin	
John Shattuck	1965	U.S. Ambassador to the Czech Republic 1998–2000; fourth President and Rector of Central European University (CEU) from August 2009 until July 31, 2016; senior fellow at the John F. Kennedy School of Government	
Derek Shearer	1968	Former United States Ambassador to Finland	
Peter Salovey	Honorary	Former president of Yale University	
Heinrich von Staden	1961	Author of Herophilus: The Art of Medicine in Early Alexandria	
James Stevenson	1951	Illustrator and author of over 100 children's books	
Myron Herbert Thompson	1969	Senior United States district judge of the United States District Court for the Middle District of Alabama	
Mark L. Wolf	1968	Senior United States district judge for the United States District Court for the District of Massachusetts	
Susan R. Wolf	1974	Edna J. Koury Professor of Philosophy at the University of North Carolina at Chapel Hill	
Wilhelmina Wright	1986	United States district judge of the United States District Court for the District of Minnesota	
Maury Yeston	1967	Wrote the music and lyrics to Nine (1982) and Titanic (1997)	

== See also ==
- List of Yale University student organizations
- Collegiate secret societies in North America
