= Havemeyer family =

American family prominent in the sugar industry

Havemeyer family Hövemeyer
- Current region: New York, U.S.
- Origin: Lower Saxony, Germany
- Founded: 1785, Arrival in New York City; 241 years ago
- Founder: William Havemeyer
- Connected families: Vanderbilt family Frelinghuysen family Goelet family Roosevelt family

The Havemeyer family is a prominent New York family of German origin that owned significant sugar refining interests in the United States.

== Background ==
The Havemeyer family traces their origin to Bückeburg, Schaumburg-Lippe (presently Lower Saxony, Germany) in the late 17th century. The name was originally spelled Hövemeyer in German and was later anglicized to Havemeyer respectively Hoevemeyer upon the arrival of the family in the U.S. in 1785.

William Havemeyer (né Hövemeyer; 1770–1851), the progenitor of the family in the U.S., arrived in New York City aged 15 in 1785 after learning the trade of sugar refining in London, United Kingdom. He was the son of Dietrich Hövemeyer and Elenore Charlotte Hövemeyer (née Hausherr). In New York, he managed a sugar house on Pine Street, before opening his own refinery on Vandam Street with his brother, Frederick Christian Havemeyer, who had come to New York in 1802. Together the two brothers operated the W. & F.C. Havemeyer Company sugar refineries, before passing the business on to their sons. His son William Frederick Havemeyer, retired from the sugar refining business in 1842 and entered politics, eventually serving three terms as Mayor of New York.

In 1855, the family relocated their refineries to Brooklyn, where they remained as the business grew to acquire a commanding share of the United States sugar refining market under the leadership of Frederick's grandson, Henry Osborne Havemeyer. The Havemeyer refineries were incorporated as the American Sugar Refining Company in 1891 and became known as Domino Sugar in 1900. In the 20th century several of the family's members made notable contributions to the arts. Henry Osborne Havemeyer and his wife Louisine Havemeyer made large bequests to the Metropolitan Museum of Art and their daughter Electra Havemeyer Webb founded the Shelburne Museum.

Havemeyer Street in the Williamsburg neighborhood of Brooklyn is named after the family.

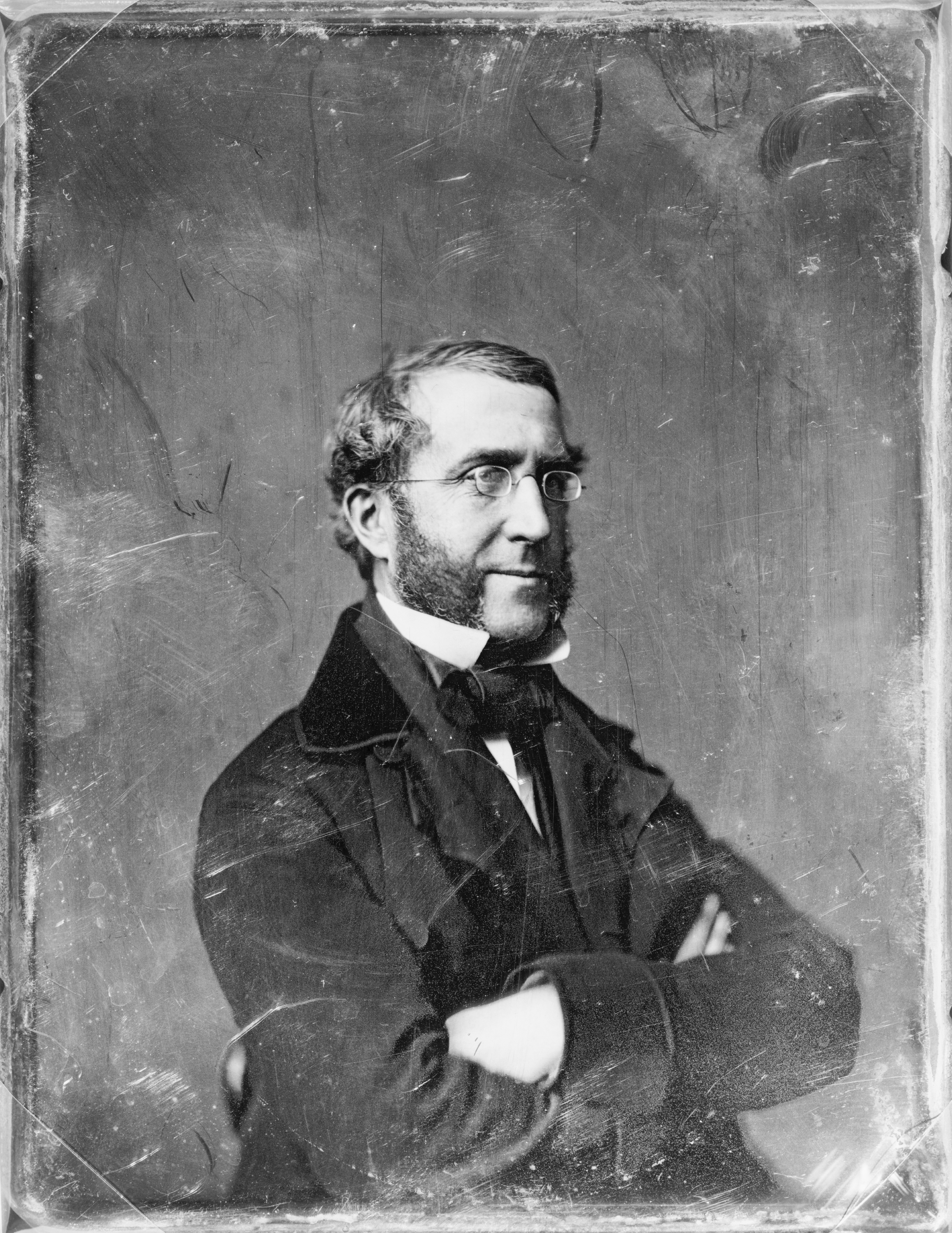
Mayor William Frederick Havemeyer (1804-1874)

== Family tree ==
- William Havemeyer (1770-1851) ∞ Susannah Clegg (1781-1838)
  - William Frederick Havemeyer (1804-1874) ∞ Sarah Agnes Craig (1807-1894)
    - John Craig Havemeyer (1832-1922)
    - Charles William Havemeyer ∞ Julia Loomis
      - Loomis Havemeyer (1886-1971)
      - Julia Loomis Havemeyer
    - Henry Havemeyer (1838-1886) ∞ Mary Moller
      - William Moller Havemeyer (1865-1900) ∞ Clara Bloodgood
    - Hector Craig Havemeyer (1840-1889)
  - Anna Margaret Havemeyer (1806-1891) ∞ Charles Burkhalter (1804-1884)
    - Susan Havemeyer Burkhalter ∞ Jacob Augustus Geissenhainer (1839-1917)
  - Albert Havemeyer (1814-1874) ∞ Henrietta Sherman (1818-1880)
    - Anne Amelia Havemeyer (1850 - 1934) ∞ Norris Woodruff Mundy (1845-1918)
      - Norris Havemeyer Mundy (1874-1943)
    - William Albert Havemeyer (1843-1903)
    - Henrietta Sherman Havemeyer (1854-1928) ∞ Charles Waldo Haskins (1852-1903)
      - Noël Haskins (1896-1982) ∞ Frederic Timothy Murphy (1884-1924)
  - Amelia Susanna Havemeyer (1820-1859) ∞ Augustus Theodosius Geissenhainer (1814-1882)
    - Anna Margaret Geissenhainer (1847-1893) ∞ George Goelet Kip (1845-1926)
      - Charles Augustus Kip (1870-1940) ∞ Marie Gilmour Bryce (1878-1940)
      - Elbert Samuel Kip (1874-1950) ∞ Alice Alden Bushnell (1872-1952)
      - Anna Elizabeth Kip (1880-1918) ∞ A. Paul Olmsted (1882-1948)

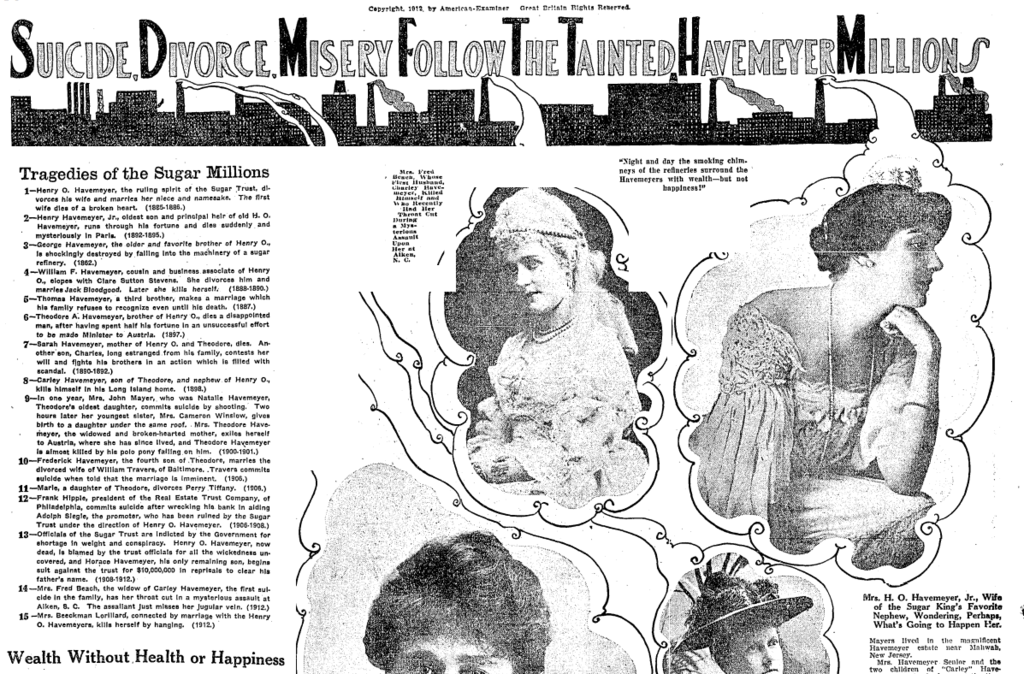
1912 Newspaper Article about the Havemeyers

- Frederick Christian Havemeyer (1774-1841) ∞ Catharine Billiger (1784-1876)
  - Frederick Christian Havemeyer (1807-1891) ∞ Sarah Louise Osborne Henderson (1812-1851)
    - Theodore Havemeyer (1839-1897) ∞ Emily de Loosey (1844–1914)
      - Charles Frederick Havemeyer (1867-1898) ∞ Camilla Woodward Moss (1869-1934)
      - Arthur Havemeyer (1882–1955)
      - Theodora Havemeyer (1878-1945) ∞ Cameron Winslow (1854-1932)
    - Henry Osborne Havemeyer (1847-1907) ∞ Louisine Waldron Elder (1855-1929)
      - Adaline Havemeyer (1884-1963) ∞ Peter Hood Ballantine Frelinghuysen
        - Peter Frelinghuysen Jr. (1916-2011)
          - Rodney Frelinghuysen (1946- )
      - Horace Havemeyer (1886-1956) ∞ Doris Anna Dick (1890-1982)
        - Horace Havemeyer Jr. (c. 1915–1990) ∞ Rosalind Everdell (1917–2017)
          - Horace Havemeyer III (1942–2014) ∞ Eugenie Cowan
          - Rosalind Havemeyer ∞ Christopher du Pont Roosevelt (b. 1941; son of F.D.R. Jr.)
      - Electra Havemeyer (1888–1960) ∞ James Watson Webb II (1884–1960)
        - James Watson Webb, Jr. (1916–2000)
  - Mary Rosina Havemeyer (1812-1885) ∞ John Isaiah Northrop
    - John Isaiah Northrop (1861-1891) ∞ Alice Belle Rich (1863-1922)
      - John Howard Northrop (1891-1987) ∞ Louise Walker
        - Alice Havemeyer Northrop (1921-2016) ∞ Frederick Chapman Robbins (1916-2003)

== See also ==
- Vanderbilt family
- Frelinghuysen family
