= Paul Dana (journalist) =

American newspaper editor (1852–1930)

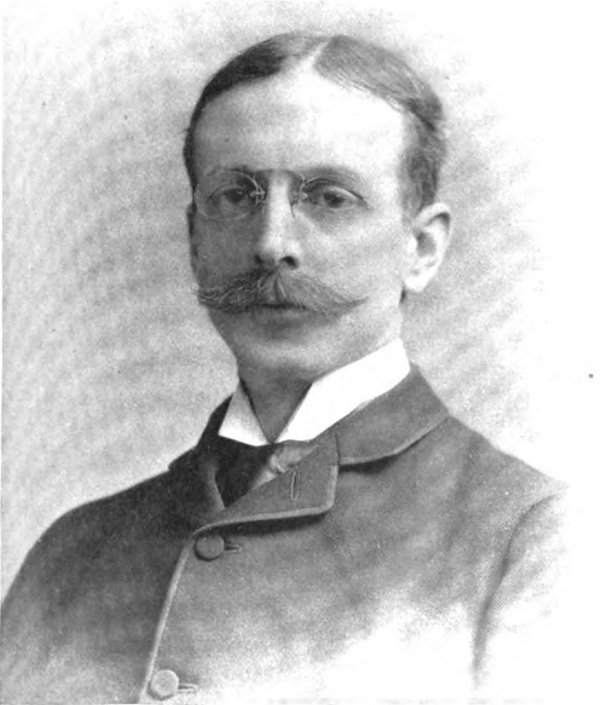
- A c. 1898 illustration of Dana
- Born: August 20, 1852; New York City, New York, U.S.
- Died: April 7, 1930 (aged 77); New York City, New York, U.S.
- Education: Harvard University; Columbia Law School
- Occupations: Journalist; Newspaper editor
- Spouse: Mary Butler Duncan (m. 1884; died 1922)
- Children: Janet Percy Dana; Anderson Dana; William Butler Duncan Dana
- Parent(s): Charles Anderson Dana; Eunice MacDaniel
- Relatives: Ruth Draper (niece)

Paul Dana (August 20, 1852 – April 7, 1930) was an American journalist and editor of The Sun, a New York newspaper.

== Early life ==
Dana was born in New York City on August 20, 1852. He was the son of Charles Anderson Dana (1819–1897) and Eunice (née MacDaniel) Dana (1824–1903). His sister, Ruth (née Dana) Draper, was the mother of Ruth Draper, the celebrated stage actress.

He graduated from Harvard University, with an A.B., in 1874 and Columbia Law School, with an LL.B., in 1878, and was admitted to the Bar shortly thereafter.

== Career ==
In 1880, he joined the staff of the New York Sun and in 1897 succeeded his father as editor. He retired in 1903. His office was at 170 Nassau Street. During World War I, he was stationed at Namur from May to June, 1915 as a member of the Committee for Relief in Belgium.

In 1890, he was appointed a commissioner of the New York City Department of Public Parks by mayor Hugh J. Grant. Dana served on the park board until his resignation in 1894, because the other commissioners refused to hire a landscape architect.

=== Society life ===
In 1892, Dana and his wife were both included in Ward McAllister's "Four Hundred", purported to be an index of New York's best families, published in The New York Times.

Dana was a member of the University Club, the Racquet and Tennis Club, the Harvard Club, and the Rockaway Hunt Club. For many years, he had a home on Dosoris Island, near Glen Cove, which his father had owned the entirety of.

== Personal life ==
On November 11, 1884, he was married to Mary Butler Duncan (1861–1922). She was the daughter of William Butler Duncan I (1830–1912) and Jane Percy Sargent (1833–1905), herself the daughter of George Washington Sargent. Mary was also the cousin and adoptive sister of William Butler Duncan II, a New York City yachtsman.

- Janet Percy Dana (1886-1974), who married Dr. Warfield Theobald Longcope (1877–1953), president of the American Association of Immunologists, in 1915. She exchanged many letters with her distant cousin, William Alexander Percy.
- Anderson Dana (1889–1960), who married Katryna Ten Broeck Weed (b. 1897), the daughter of George Standish Weed, in 1917. They divorced in 1947.
- William Butler Duncan Dana (1891–1930), who married Anstiss Weston (1895–1979), daughter of Robert D. Weston, in June 1916. Their daughter, Anstiss Dana, married Arthur M. Jones, Jr. in 1942.

After the death of his wife in 1922, Paul Dana lived at the University Club in New York.

Dana died at Doctors Hospital on April 7, 1930, in New York City. After a service at Grace Church in Manhattan, he was buried at St. Paul's Cemetery in Glen Cove on Long Island. He left his estate to his children.
