= USS Winslow =

USS Winslow may refer to one of several United States Navy ships:

Named in honor of Rear Admiral John Ancrum Winslow:

- USS Winslow (TB-5), a torpedo boat during the Spanish–American War
- USS Winslow (DD-53), an O'Brien-class destroyer, commissioned in 1915, served during World War I and decommissioned in 1922

Named in honor of John Ancrum Winslow and his second cousin, Admiral Cameron Winslow:

- USS Winslow (DD-359), a Porter-class destroyer, commissioned in 1937 and served in World War II, redesignated AG-127 in 1945 and decommissioned in 1950
