= William Butler Duncan =

American seaman (1862–1933)

William Butler Duncan II (May 1, 1862 – March 30, 1933), also known as Butler Duncan, was a leader in American yacht racing and naval service.

== Early life ==
William was born on May 1, 1862, in Providence, Rhode Island, the son of David Duncan (1835–1873) and Fannie (née Bloodgood) Duncan (1832–1874). After his parents' early deaths, young William was adopted by his paternal uncle, W. Butler Duncan I. His adoptive father (and uncle) was born in Edinburgh and became a banker in New York and chairman of the Mobile and Ohio Railroad. From 1858 to 1896, the Duncan family maintained a residence on Grymes Hill, Staten Island, in the former home of the neighborhood's namesake Suzette Grymes. William II graduated from the United States Naval Academy in 1882.

== Career ==
=== Military ===
After graduation from the Naval Academy, Duncan stayed in the U.S. Navy for two years until 1884, serving on the USS Vandalia. In 1891, he was one of the organizers of the 1st Battalion of the New York Naval Militia, and served as commanding officer of one of its divisions. During the Spanish–American War, he served on the USS Yankee, and in World War I he was a Commander in the Naval Reserve.

=== Civilian ===
Duncan joined the New York Yacht Club in 1889, serving as Rear Commodore in 1891 and 1892, and as Vice Commodore in 1893. He was on the Race Committee in 1900, and served on the Membership Committee for eleven years and on several rules committees, playing a key role in the club's long defense of the America's Cup.

== Personal life ==
In 1891, Duncan married Blanche Maximillian "Blanca" Havemeyer (1871–1958) at the Havemeyer cottage on Bellevue Avenue in Newport, Rhode Island. Blanca was the daughter of Theodore Havemeyer and Emilie (née de Loosey) Havemeyer. Among her siblings was Charles Frederick Havemeyer, who married Camilla Woodward Moss, and Theodora Havemeyer, who married Admiral Cameron Winslow. Together, Blanche and William were the parents of four children who survived to adulthood, including:

- Natalie Duncan (b. 1892), who married Louis W. Noel.
- David Duncan (1893–1936), who married Emmelina Thomsen Sizer (1895–1968) in 1920.
- William Butler Duncan III (1903–1944), who died in Jefferson County, Missouri.
- Dorothy Duncan, who married Thomas M. Carnegie III (1901–1954) in 1922, a grandson of Thomas M. Carnegie and grandnephew of Andrew Carnegie. They divorced and she married Hugh Kelleher.

After his death on March 30, 1933, William Butler Duncan II was buried at sea from the USS Cole with full naval honors. His wife died in Aiken, South Carolina in April 1958.
