= Charles Frederick Havemeyer =

American socialite

- Born: March 1867; New York City, U.S.
- Died: May 9, 1898 (aged 31); Roslyn, New York, U.S.
- Education: Columbia School of Mines (1889)
- Spouse: Camilla Woodward Moss (m. 1890)
- Children: 2
- Parent(s): Theodore Havemeyer; Emily de Loosey
- Relatives: See Havemeyer family

Charles Frederick Havemeyer (March 1867 – May 9, 1898) was an American socialite who was prominent in New York society during the Gilded Age.

Havemeyer was educated at the Columbia School of Mines, and later worked for a "Sugar Trust" founded and run by his family. In 1892, Havemeyer was included in Ward McAllister's "Four Hundred", purported to be an index of New York's best families. On May 9, 1898, Havemeyer was supposedly dressing for dinner when he committed suicide with a gunshot wound in the head. He was only 31-years-old, and his wife was pregnant at the time of his death. No motive was ever determined for his death.

== Early life ==
Havemeyer was born in March 1867 and was known as "Carley". He was the eldest boy of nine children born to Theodore Havemeyer (1839–1897) and Emilie (née de Loosey) Havemeyer (1844–1914). His siblings included Nathalie Ida Blanche Havemeyer, who married John Mayer; Emily Blanche Havemeyer, who married Edward Clarkson Potter; Theodore Augustus Havemeyer, Jr.; Blanche Maximillian Havemeyer, who married William Butler Duncan, Jr.; Marie Ida Pauline Havemeyer, who married Perry Tiffany and H. F. Godfrey; Henry Osborne Havemeyer II, who became a major financier of Stephen Birch and the future Kennecott Copper Company; Theodora Havemeyer, who married Admiral Cameron Winslow; and Frederick Christian Havemeyer, who married Lillie Harriman, daughter of Oliver Harriman.

His paternal grandparents were Frederick Christian Havemeyer Jr., who started the family business, and Sarah Louise (née Henderson) Havemeyer. His maternal grandfather was Chevalier Charles Frederick de Loosey, the Austrian Consul to New York. His father and uncle, Henry Osborne Havemeyer, constructed "one of the most modern sugar refineries in the world." His father also co-founded the Newport Country Club, U.S. Amateur Championship and U.S. Open.

== Career ==
Havemeyer was educated at home, then preparatory school, and then attended Columbia School of Mines with the class of 1889. After Columbia, he entered the Havemeyer sugar house and "Sugar Trust" founded and run by his family.

=== Society life ===
In 1892, Havemeyer and his wife were included in Ward McAllister's "Four Hundred", purported to be an index of New York's best families, published in The New York Times. Conveniently, 400 was the number of people that could fit into Mrs. Astor's ballroom.

== Personal life ==
On October 16, 1890, Havemeyer was married to the noted beauty Camilla Woodward Moss (1869–1934), the daughter of Courtland Dixon Moss and Camilla (née Woodward) Moss. They had a residence in New York City, a home known as "Old Brick Farm" in Roslyn, New York, and spent the winter in Aiken, South Carolina. Together, they were the parents of two children:

- Theodore Augustus Havemeyer III (1892–1941), who moved to Vancouver where he was involved in the lumber business and where he married Jeannette Aileen MacLean (1894–1979), daughter of Ewen Wainwright MacLean, in 1915. He was previously engaged to Vida Bispham, a daughter of David Bispham.
- Charles Frederick Havemeyer Jr. (1898–1961), a sailor who attended Harvard University and served in France during World War I with the U.S. Marine Corps. Charles raced in the British-American Cup match in 1923. Also in 1923, he married Ellen Randolph, a daughter of Edmund Randolph.

His father died on April 26, 1897, and left an estate valued at $4 million.

== Suicide ==
On May 9, 1898, just ten minutes after playing with his son Teddy and while dressing for dinner, Havemeyer died from a gunshot wound in the head from a pistol at his home in Roslyn the age of 31. The suicide was never determined to be on purpose or an accident, although commonly believed to be an intentional suicide, no motive was ever determined. After a funeral at the Church of the Holy Innocents in Manhattan, he was buried at Green-Wood Cemetery in Brooklyn, New York.

After his death, in December 1898, his widow gave birth to a second son, who she named after Charles. She later remarried to broker Frederick Ogden Beach Sr. (with William K. Vanderbilt as best man), who was known as "Beauty Beach" for his good looks, with whom she had two more sons. Later in February 1912, Camilla had her throat slashed at her Aiken home. Much to the surprise of both Camilla and Frederick, Beach was charged for attempted murder, although he was later acquitted. The culprit was never identified.

=== Descendants ===
Through his eldest son Teddy, he was, posthumously, the grandfather of Gloria Camilla MacLean Havemeyer (1917–1989). She married Clive John Fenwick Phillipps-Wolley, son of Lieutenant-Commander Clive Phillipps-Wolley and grandson of Clive Phillipps-Wolley, in 1936.
