= Stephen Birch =

American businessman (1873–1950)

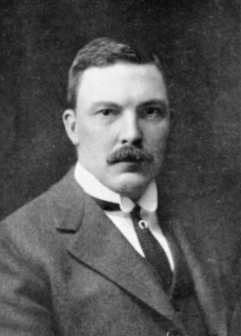
- Born: March 24, 1872; New York City, U.S.
- Died: December 29, 1940 (aged 68); New York City, U.S.
- Education: New York University; Columbia School of Mines
- Occupation: Businessman
- Spouse: Mary C. Rand (m. 1916)
- Children: Stephen; Mary

Stephen Birch (March 24, 1872 – December 29, 1940) was an American mining executive who served as president of the Kennecott Copper Company, and would eventually control a major share of the world's copper production.

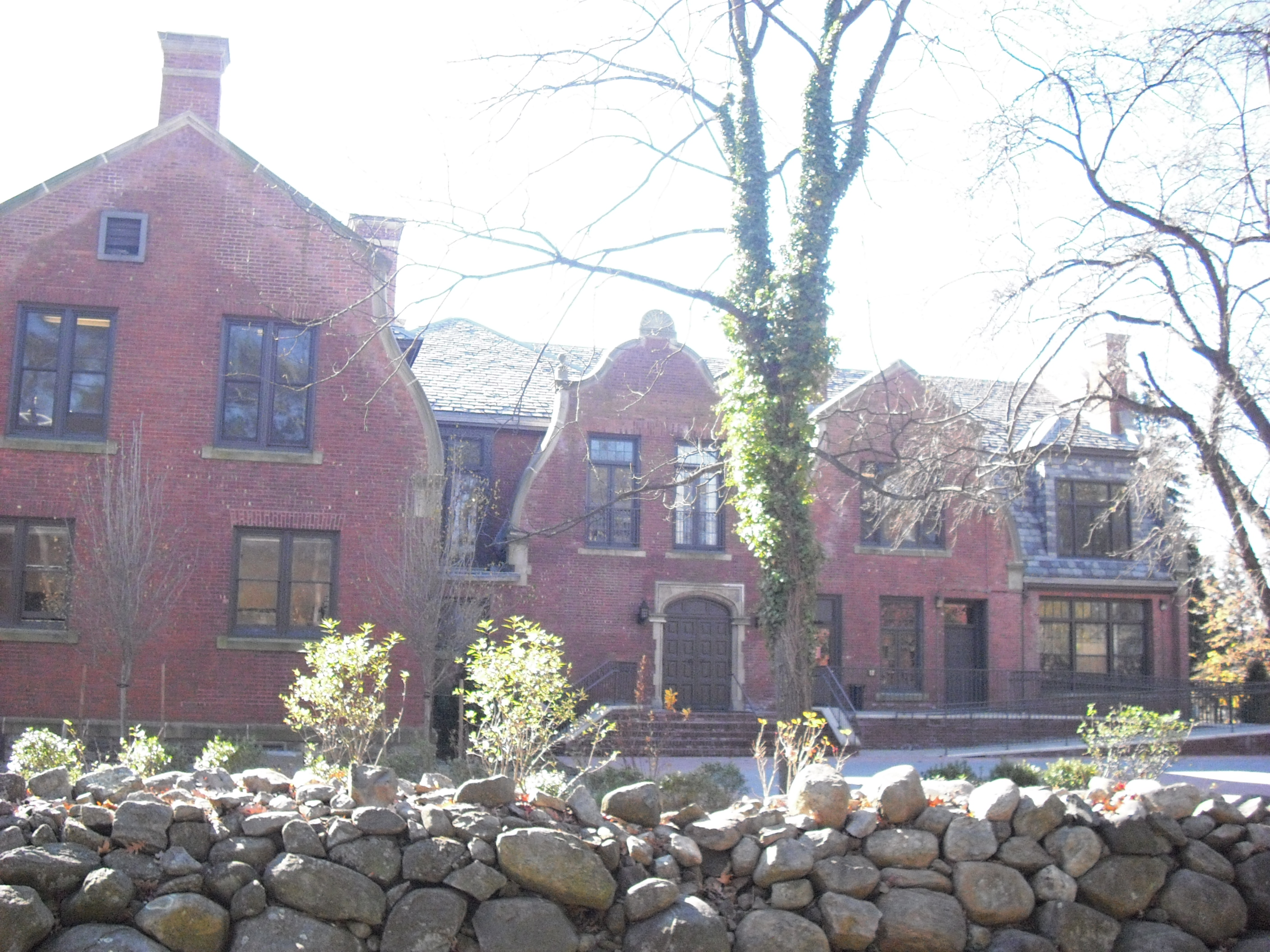
The Birch Mansion now serves as an administration building at Ramapo College of New Jersey

== Early life ==
Stephen Birch was born in New York City on March 24, 1872 as the second of six children. His father, a Union Army sergeant, died when Birch was ten years old. Three years after his father's death, his mother moved the family from Brooklyn to Mahwah, New Jersey, to be near relatives. The young Birches befriended their neighbors, the children of Theodore Havemeyer, who was the vice-president of the American Sugar Refining Company, and his wife, Lillie. Mrs. Havemeyer provided financial assistance for Stephen's education at Trinity School, New York University, and the Columbia School of Mines. He received his Master's of Engineering from Columbia University in 1898.

== Career ==
In 1898, at the height of the Klondike gold rush, Birch traveled to Alaska instead of continuing his work with an engineering team surveying for the New York City subway system. Mrs. Havemeyer offered to pay for his trip to Valdez, a newly established port city providing a route to Alaska's interior. Birch arrived in Valdez in the summer of 1898.

Reports of copper in this region had emerged decades earlier and had attracted the attention of the United States Geological Survey. Geologists from the survey later guided prospectors.

Birch was in Valdez when prospectors returned in the fall of 1900. With the backing of the Havemeyers, he purchased 21 claims. Ownership was later transferred to the new Alaska Copper and Coal Company, with Henry Osborne Havemeyer as president and Birch as manager.

Materials for the mining operation were transported by boat and horse to the remote site at the base of the Kennicott Glacier. Birch organized a new entity and sought assistance from Daniel Guggenheim and J.P. Morgan. This collaboration evolved into the Kennecott Mining Company, with offices in New York City, and Birch as Managing Director. In 1915, Birch became president of the reorganized Kennecott Copper Company. As resources at the Alaska mines were depleted, Birch directed the company's diversification into related products and other sources of copper in Utah, Nevada, Arizona, New Mexico, and Chile. As of 1915, under his direction, Kennecott Copper had 450 employees and $11 million in sales.

Birch resigned as president of the Kennecott Copper Company in 1933 and was replaced by E.T. Stannard. Birch continued as chairman of the board of directors and Executive Committee. In addition to his positions with Kennecott, Birch was president and director of the Alaska Steamship Company and chairman of the board of directors of the Braden Copper Company. He also served as a director of the Alaska Development and Mineral Company, the Banker's Trust Company of New York, the Chicago, Burlington and Quincy Railroad Company, the Colorado and Southern Railway Company, and the Northern Pacific Railway Company.

At the time of his death, Kennecott reportedly held nearly 15% of the world's known copper resources and was the largest copper producer in the United States. In 1940, the year of his death, his company employed 28,872 employees and had sales of $177,250,036.

Kennecott Copper Company's original Alaska location is now a tourist attraction often referred to as a "ghost town". The buildings and mills remain standing.

Birch was recognized for his contributions to the mining industry, including induction into the Mining Hall of Fame and being named among the 20th Century American Leaders by Harvard Business School.

== Personal life ==
Birch married Mary C. Rand in Minneapolis, Minnesota on June 24, 1916. His best man was his longtime friend, Henry Havemeyer. He and his wife had two children, Stephen and Mary. The Havemeyers sold their mansion and 730 acres of their estate to Birch. He added the York Room to the mansion for his daughter, Mary, and her husband in the 1920s. Birch lived in the mansion with his family until he died at age 68 at Doctors Hospital on December 29, 1940. Birch is buried at Ferncliff Mausoleum in Hartsdale, New York. The mausoleum is adorned with a stained-glass window depicting an Alaskan mountain scenery.

After his death, his estate went to his son, Stephen. Stephen died in 1970, at the same time that the founders of Ramapo College were searching for land. After visiting the land, they decided that the Birch estate would be the new home for the college. The final settlement on the Birch property was concluded in 1972 for $3,133,000, or a little over $10,000 per acre. The Birch mansion is now used as an administration building at Ramapo College of New Jersey.

Birch was known for being a private man who avoided publicity, seldom gave interviews, or had his picture taken. However, he did have his portrait painted in 1911 by Swiss-born American artist Adolfo Müller-Ury. According to Copper Tints Magazine in 1911, Birch was perceived as a private individual known for loyalty and friendship.

== Philanthropy ==
In 1938, Birch founded the Stephen and Mary Birch Foundation, Inc. to support health services, hospitals, and civic organizations. It provided major funding for the Stephen Birch Aquarium-Museum at the University of California, San Diego, and continues to support similar causes. In 2014, it made a $10 million contribution to Sharp HealthCare Foundation for a new healthcare facility at Sharp Memorial Hospital in San Diego. In recognition of this gift, Sharp named the new facility the Stephen Birch Healthcare Center. This contribution was the largest in Sharp's history at the time, bringing the total the Stephen and Mary Birch Foundation had donated to Sharp to more than $16 million.
