= Electra Havemeyer Webb =

American antiques collector

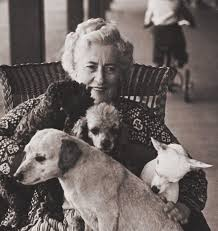
- Webb sitting with dogs
- Born: Electra Havemeyer; August 16, 1888; Babylon, New York
- Died: November 19, 1960 (aged 72); Burlington, Vermont
- Spouse: James Watson Webb II
- Children: 5
- Parent(s): Henry Osborne Havemeyer and Louisine Elder Havemeyer
- Relatives: See Havemeyer family

Electra Havemeyer Webb (August 16, 1888 – November 19, 1960) was a collector of American antiques and founder of the Shelburne Museum.

== Early life ==
Electra Havemeyer was born on August 16, 1888. She was the youngest child of Henry Osborne Havemeyer (1847–1907), President of the American Sugar Refining Company, and Louisine Elder (1855–1929). She had two older siblings, Adaline Havemeyer (1884–1963), who married Peter Hood Ballantine Frelinghuysen, and Horace Havemeyer (1886–1956), who married Doris Dick Havemeyer.

Her paternal grandparents were Frederick Christian Havemeyer Jr. (1807-1891), and Sarah Louise Henderson Havemeyer (1812-1851). Her maternal grandparents were merchant George W. Elder (1831–1873) and his wife, Matilda Adelaide Waldron (1834–1907).

She attended Miss Spence's School and traveled with her family to the American West, France, Italy, Spain, Egypt, Greece and Austria.

== Career ==
During World War I, Webb drove an ambulance in New York City, and was named Assistant Director of the Motor Corps. In 1942, during World War II she joined the Civilian Defense Volunteer Organization, and directed the Pershing Square Civil Defense Center and its blood bank.

=== Collector ===
Although she spent her youth examples of European and Asian material culture, Webb's own collecting took a different approach. Webb lived with more than twenty extremely fine Impressionist works from her parents' collection in a penthouse at 740 Park Avenue during part of the year. She decorated a small pink farmhouse on 1,000-acre (4 km^{2}) portion of her in-laws' estate with simple New England furniture and craftwork. Quilts, tiger maple furniture and hooked rugs filled the homey rooms of her country house. Webb's Vermont home was modest and comfortable in scale. Her "Brick House" survives today as a rare and intact example of the Colonial Revival, providing an intimate glimpse into the life of a pioneer collector of America and founder of the Shelburne Museum. The home was in the Webb family until 2000 when the structure and its contents were acquired by the museum. Following a 4.4 million dollar campaign by the museum to restore the home to Mrs. Webb's decor, the museum was recognized by Preservation Trust of Vermont in 2005 for their efforts in preserving the Brick House. Since 2004, it has been open to the public by reservation for guided tours during the summer months.

=== Shelburne Museum ===
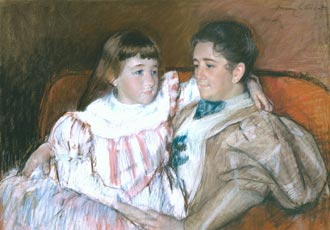
Louisine Havemeyer and her Daughter Electra, 1895 pastel on paper by Mary Cassatt. Collection of Shelburne Museum

The closing of one of the Webb's other homes near the polo grounds at Old Westbury unintentionally birthed a museum. In 1947 Webb gathered with her friends to create Shelburne Museum. Located on U.S. Route 7 in Shelburne, Vermont, Webb's museum housed various handmade objects including weathervanes, trade signs, portraits carriages, sleighs, and furniture.

Rather than confine her eclectic collections to a single modern gallery, Webb chose to create an institution that would showcase her "collection of collections" in examples of early American homes and public buildings. A general store, meeting house, log cabin, and a steamship occupy the grounds. The entire museum reflects Webb's passion for American art and design, as she treasured a variety of objects. Five rooms from her Park Avenue apartment were installed in a Greek Revival memorial building after her death in 1960, bringing Webb's collection of works by Monet, Manet, and Degas to the museum grounds.

Webb began collecting in 1911, before the founding of Colonial Williamsburg and decades before authentic American antiques returned to the major rooms of the White House. At the time, the National Register of Historic Places did not exist. Webb was a prominent and ambitious collector of Americana. She collaborated with leading antique dealers of the era, including Edith Halpert and Harry Newman, to assemble extensive and unique collections of American material culture. Drawn to the authenticity of everyday objects, Webb used her resources to preserve them, and today the museum’s Americana collection is considered one of the finest in the world.

==== Deaccession Controversy ====
In 1996 the museum sold $30 million of her artwork, deemed non-essential to the collection, which had been in storage not visible to the public for years to create a collections care endowment, to better preserve and secure the items in the collection. While the board had considered other ways to care for the items, including mergers and loaning out the collection, the final choice received some backlash in the art community. The president of the American Association of Museums refused to endorse the move arguing that the museum was unfairly conflating care for the items with security, while the director at the time argued it set a dangerous precedent for other museums doing the same. Webb's son, James Watson Webb, Jr. went on the record saying that he was disappointed with the move as well. Most buyers were unidentified telephone bidders, but one item was sold to casino mogul Stephen A. Wynn with the intent of displaying it at the Bellagio casino.

== Personal life ==
In 1910, Webb married polo champion James Watson Webb II (1884–1960) of the Vanderbilt family in an elaborate society wedding at St. Bartholomew's Episcopal Church, New York. He was a son of William Seward Webb and Eliza Osgood Vanderbilt. They had five children:

- Electra Webb (1910–1982)
- Samuel Webb (1912–1988)
- Lila Webb(1913–1961)
- James Watson Webb, Jr. (1916–2000)
- Harry Webb (1922–1975).

Recognizing her achievements in the museum field, Yale University awarded Webb an honorary Master of Arts degree in 1956. She was the fifth woman to be recognized in this manner.

She died on November 19, 1960, at Mary Fletcher Hospital in Burlington, Vermont.

=== Shelburne Farms ===
Webb's parents-in-law Dr. William Seward Webb and Eliza Osgood Vanderbilt had transformed a collection of rambling lakeside farms on the shore of Vermont's Lake Champlain into a model country estate. The core of property, the Shelburne Farms, survives today as a nonprofit education center for sustainability. Recalling her first visit to the Webb estate as a young girl, Webb declared: "I felt as though I was in dreamland"; she was smitten by the beauty of Vermont's Champlain Valley. On the Webb estate she enjoyed horseback riding, the 113-foot steam yacht and one of America's first private nine-hole golf courses. The pastoral landscape and lush grounds of Shelburne Farms would be replicated at Electra Havemeyer Webb's museum. Shelburne Museum is well known for its fine collection of lilacs, peonies and New England perennials.

== See also ==
- Havemeyer
- Electra Havemeyer Webb Memorial Building
- Vanderbilt family
