= Jessie Phipps =

British politician (1856–1934)

Dame Jessie Wilton Phipps DBE (née Duncan; 9 February 1856 – 7 August 1934) was an American-born British politician who served on London County Council.

Born at 1 Fifth Avenue in New York as Jessie Percy Butler Duncan, her parents were William Butler Duncan and Jane Percy Sargent. In 1876, she married William Wilton Phipps, from Wiltshire, England. In 1880, the couple moved to the United Kingdom, settling in London the following year. There, she struck up a friendship with Maude Lawrence, and this led her to become the manager of several schools in Chelsea.

Phipps was elected to London County Council in 1907, as a Municipal Reform Party member, and in 1913 she became an alderman. From 1907, she served on the council's education committee, chairing it from 1923 to 1926, the first woman to do so. She served as vice-chair of the council in 1920/21, also the first woman to hold this post.

In 1926, Phipps was made a Dame Commander of the Order of the British Empire. She reduced her commitments on the council, and from 1926 to 1931 chaired the Central Council for the London Blind. This was inspired by her own failing eyesight, and by 1931 this increasingly poor sight led her to give up her work. She died in 1934, aged 78.

Her son, the architect, Paul Phipps, was the father of actor and comedian, Joyce Grenfell
