= Betts Academy =

Defunct school in Stamford, Connecticut

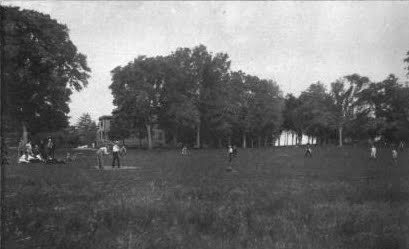
- Stamford, Connecticut

Information
- Type: Private Academy

Betts Academy was a well-known private academy in Stamford, Connecticut that operated from 1838 to 1908.

== History ==
The school was founded in 1838 in North Stamford by James Betts, a Congregational Church deacon originally from Wilton, Connecticut. Later his son, William J. Betts, became principal of the school, and the academy was relocated to Strawberry Hill overlooking Long Island Sound in Stamford. The school burned in a fire in 1908 and was closed that year.

== Notable alumni ==
- Henry Osborne Havemeyer, businessman
- Theodore Havemeyer, businessman, co-founder of United States Golf Association and U.S. Open
- Eugene O'Neill, Playwright
- Thomas Midgley Jr, mechanical and chemical engineer.
