= J. Watson Webb Jr. =

American film editor (1916–2000)

President of the Shelburne Museum
- In office 1960–1977
- Preceded by: Electra Havemeyer Webb

Personal details
- Born: James Watson Webb III; January 9, 1916; Syosset, New York, U.S.
- Died: June 10, 2000 (aged 84); Los Angeles, California, U.S.
- Relations: See Vanderbilt family
- Parent(s): James Watson Webb II; Electra Havemeyer
- Education: Groton School
- Alma mater: Yale University
- Occupation: Film editor, philanthropist

James Watson Webb III (known as J. Watson Jr.) (January 9, 1916 – June 10, 2000) was an American film editor and heir to both the Havemeyer and Vanderbilt families.

== Early life ==
He was born in Syosset, New York, to James Watson Webb II of the Vanderbilt family and Electra Havemeyer. His siblings were Electra (1910–1982), Samuel (1912–1988), Lila (1913–1961) and Harry (1922–1975).

He attended Groton School and Yale University from which he graduated in 1938.

== Career ==
He began work in California as an apprentice film editor at 20th-Century Fox, and eventually became head of the editing department. As Zanuck's head film cutter, he was involved in the founding of the American Cinema Editors.

Webb was the credited editor—as "J. Watson Webb" or "J. Watson Webb Jr."—on 30 films from 1941–52 including A Letter to Three Wives, The Razor's Edge with Tyrone Power, Wing and a Prayer, State Fair, With a Song in My Heart, Call Northside 777, Broken Arrow with James Stewart and Cheaper by the Dozen.

Also among his credits, along with Three Wives (1949) starring Jeanne Crain, Linda Darnell, Ann Sothern and Kirk Douglas were The Jackpot (1950) also with Stewart and Don't Bother to Knock (1952) starring Marilyn Monroe, Richard Widmark and Anne Bancroft. Webb retired from film editing in 1952. Barbara McLean, his boss, promoted Hugh S. Fowler to replace Webb.

=== Shelburne Museum ===
Webb succeeded his mother and served as the president of the Shelburne Museum from 1960 until 1977 and then as chairman of the board of directors until 1996. Watson resigned from the board in a dispute over deaccessioning of an estimated $25-million worth of the museum's Impressionist collection which his mother had donated to the museum.

Webb gave his mother's folk art first purchase, made at the age of 18 in Stamford, Connecticut, prominent display in his California home for decades.

== Personal life ==
He died in Los Angeles, California, on June 10, 2000. Webb never married and was survived by three nephews and six nieces.
