= Theodore Havemeyer =

American businessman (1839–1897)

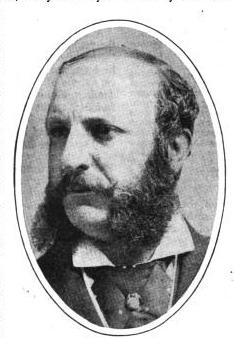
- Born: Theodore Augustus Havemeyer; May 17, 1839; New York City, New York, U.S.
- Died: April 26, 1897 (aged 57); New York City, New York, U.S.
- Education: Mr. Betts' School
- Spouse: Emily de Loosey (m. 1862)
- Children: 9
- Parent(s): Frederick Christian Havemeyer Jr. Sarah Louise Henderson
- Relatives: See Havemeyer family

Theodore Augustus Havemeyer (May 17, 1839 – April 26, 1897) was an American businessman who was the first president of the U.S. Golf Association and co-founder of the Newport Country Club, host to both the first U.S. Amateur and the first U.S. Open in 1895.

== Early life ==
Havemeyer was born in New York City on May 17, 1839. He was the eldest son of three children born to Frederick Christian Havemeyer Jr. (1807-1891), and Sarah Louise (née Henderson) Havemeyer (1812-1851). His mother died in 1851 and he was then raised with the help of his grandmothers, Mary Osborne Henderson and Catharine Billiger Havemeyer, and his oldest sister, Mary Havemeyer. The family lived in a house at 193 West 14th Street, in what was then the northern frontier of New York City. Theodore studied at Mr. Betts' School (Betts Academy) in Stamford, Connecticut.

Theodore's grandfather, a German immigrant, came to the United States in 1802 and started a sugar refining company with his brother and Theodore's father started his own firm, Havemeyer & Elder.

== Career ==
Theodore became an apprentice in his father's firm and later was made a partner working with his brother Henry Osborne Havemeyer. After traveling to Germany and England, in search of new advances in the sugar refining trade, Theodore constructed the Domino Sugar Refinery, "one of the most modern sugar refineries in the world."

Theodore Havemeyer was also the Austro-Hungarian Consul-General in New York City for twenty-five years, up until 1895. He became president of the New York Golf Club and the first president United States Golf Association, as well. Havemeyer co-founded the Newport Country Club, U.S. Amateur Championship and U.S. Open. The U.S. Amateur trophy, the Havemeyer Cup, is currently named in his honor.

His portrait was painted by the Swiss-born American artist Adolfo Müller-Ury, one is now in the New York State Museum at Albany; Müller-Ury also painted in 1891 a huge portrait of his wife Emilie de Loosey Havemeyer (Preservation Society of Newport County, Rhode Island (at Rosecliff).

=== Estates ===
The family owned many estates including, a town house in New York City at 244 Madison Avenue (on the southwest corner of 38th Street), a "cottage" on Bellevue Avenue in Newport, Rhode Island, and 500 acres in Mahwah, New Jersey, called Mountain Side Farm. 300 acres of the Mahwah estate is currently the campus of Ramapo College of New Jersey. The house that Havemeyer and his family lived in is now the home to the college's President and the house that Havemeyer had built for his daughter Lillie, as part of the estate, currently stands as the Administration Building for the college.

== Personal life ==
In 1862, Havemeyer married Emily de Loosey (1840–1914), daughter of Chevalier Charles F. de Loosey, the Austrian Consul General to New York and sister of Mrs. Charles May Oelrichs. Together, they were the parents of nine children, five daughters and four sons, including:

- Nathalie Ida Blanche Havemeyer (1864–1900), known as "Lillie", who married John Mayer. She "died from the effects of a pistol shot accidentally fired."
- Emily Blanche Havemeyer (b. 1865), who married Edward Clarkson Potter, a son of architect Edward Tuckerman Potter.
- Charles Frederick Havemeyer (1867–1898), who married Camilla Woodward Moss and became well known in New York Society.
- Theodore Augustus Havemeyer Jr. (b. 1868)
- Blanche Maximillian Havemeyer (1871–1958), who married William Butler Duncan, nephew and adopted son of W. Butler Duncan.
- Marie Ida Pauline Havemeyer (1872–1925), who married Perry Tiffany (1866–1928), grandson of Matthew C. Perry circa 1893 and Henry Fletcher Godfrey, Jr. (1874–1940) circa 1905
- Henry Osborne Havemeyer II (1876–1965), who became a major financier of Stephen Birch and the future Kennecott Copper Company. He married Charlotte Whiting (1880–1962) in 1900.
- Theodora Havemeyer (1878–1945), who married Admiral Cameron Winslow.
- Frederick Christian Havemeyer (1879-1948), who in 1906 married Lillie Harriman (1870-1953), daughter of Oliver H. Harriman. and in 1938 married Aninha Carver (1895-1978)

Havemeyer died intestate at his home, 244 Madison Avenue in New York City, on April 26, 1897. His funeral service was held at St. Patrick's Cathedral in New York and he was buried at Green-Wood Cemetery. He left an estate valued at $4 million.
