= John Isaiah Northrop =

American zoologist

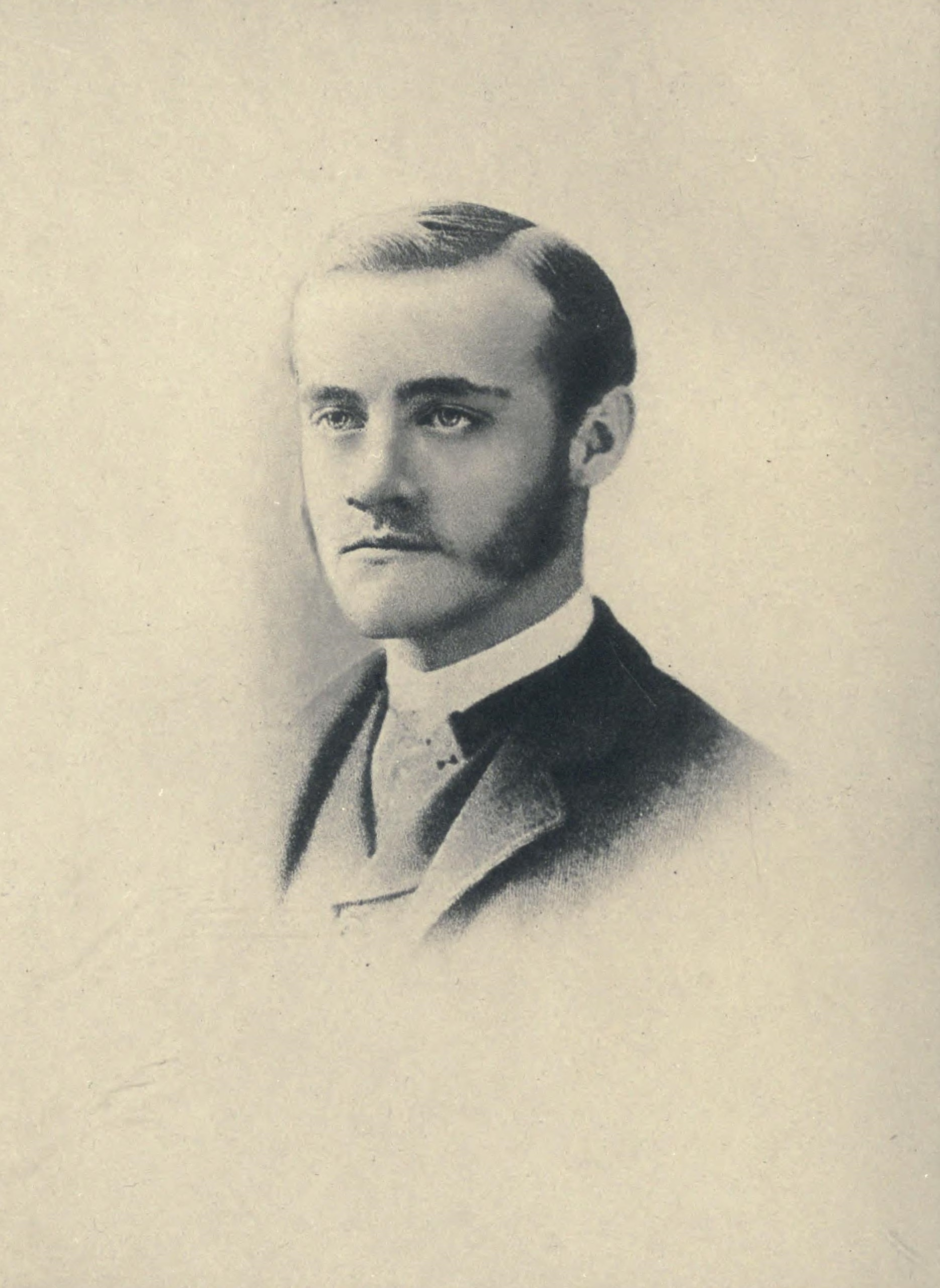
- Born: October 12, 1861; New York City, United States
- Died: June 27, 1891 (aged 29); New York City
- Occupation: Zoologist
- Spouse: Alice Belle Rich
- Parent(s): John Isaiah Northrop and Mary Rosina Havemeyer
- Relatives: See Havemeyer family

John Isaiah Northrop, Ph.D. (12 October 1861 – 27 June 1891) was an American zoologist at Columbia University.

== Biography ==
John I. Northrop was born in New York City. He was named after his father, John Isaiah Northrop, a pharmacist. His mother, Mary R. Havemeyer, was a sister of Frederic Christian Havemeyer, a graduate of Columbia College, after whom Havemeyer Hall is named. His father died when he was two years old. Northrop studied for some years at a private school in New Windsor, New York, then at the Columbia Grammar & Preparatory School, in which he prepared for the Columbia School of Mines. He graduated in 1884, with the degree of Engineer of Mines.

On June 28, 1889, he married Alice Belle Rich, at the time professor in Botany at the Hunter College. In 1891, almost exactly two years after his marriage, Dr. Northrop was killed in a laboratory explosion at the Columbia School of Mines. His only child, John Howard Northrop (Nobel Laureate in Chemistry, 1946), was born nine days after his father's death.

== Works ==
- (1887). Plant Notes from Temiscouata County, Canada.
- (1888). Histology of Hoya Carnosa.
- (1888). Fossil Leaves from Bridgeton, New Jersey.
- (1910). A Naturalist in the Bahamas.
- Together with his wife he edited the exsiccata Bahama plants, collected and distributed by John I. and Alice R. Northrop.
