= Loomis Havemeyer =

- Born: 1886; Rye, New York
- Died: 1971 (aged 84–85); New Haven, Connecticut
- Occupation: Academic
- Relatives: See Havemeyer family

Loomis Havemeyer (June 7, 1886 – August 14, 1971) was a professor and administrator at Yale University who published books on anthropology and Yale.

Havemeyer was born in Rye, New York but spent most of his childhood in Hartford, Connecticut after his parents divorced. His grandfather William Frederick Havemeyer was three time Mayor of New York City, and his maternal grandfather Francis Loomis was lieutenant governor of Connecticut from 1887 to 1889.

He was educated at The Hill School in Pottstown, Pennsylvania. In 1907 he went to Sheffield Scientific School at Yale University where he gained a Bachelor of Philosophy in 1910. He then studied anthropology at Yale and received his MA in 1912 and was awarded a Ph.D. in 1915 for his dissertation "The Drama of Savage Peoples."

His academic career began in 1913 as instructor of geography and anthropology. He continued to teach as both lecturer and assistant professor, and his subjects included economic geography, social sciences and evolution. He is most noted for his administrative contributions, as registrar (1919-1929), assistant dean (1929-1941) and associate dean (1941-1945) of Sheffield Scientific School. He was registrar of the Yale School of Engineering (1932-1954); director of undergraduate registration (1945-1948); associate dean in charge of undergraduate registration (1941-1954); and director of undergraduate schedules and allocations (1954-1969). He was awarded the Yale Medal of Honor in 1967 in recognition of his role in the operation of the university.

He was a member of the Book and Snake Society as an undergraduate. He was a founder of the Aurelian Honor Society and published "The Aurelian honor society of Yale University and its times : 1910-1955" in 1955.

His papers are located in the Sterling Memorial Library at Yale University.
