= John Howard Northrop =

American biochemist (1891–1987)

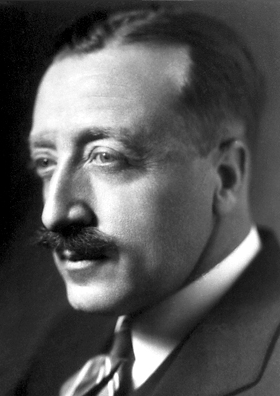
- Born: July 5, 1891; Yonkers, New York, U.S.
- Died: May 27, 1987 (aged 95); Wickenburg, Arizona, U.S.
- Education: Columbia University (B.A., Ph.D.)
- Known for: Studies of enzymes
- Awards: Nobel Prize in Chemistry (1946); Daniel Giraud Elliot Medal (1939)
- Scientific career
- Fields: Biochemistry
- Workplaces: University of California, Berkeley; Columbia University; Rockefeller University

John Howard Northrop (July 5, 1891 – May 27, 1987) was an American biochemist who, with James Batcheller Sumner and Wendell Meredith Stanley, won the 1946 Nobel Prize in Chemistry. The award was given for these scientists' isolation, crystallization, and study of enzymes, proteins, and viruses. Northrop was a Professor of Bacteriology and Medical Physics, Emeritus, at University of California, Berkeley.

== Biography ==
=== Early years ===
Northrop was born in Yonkers, New York, to John Isaiah, a zoologist and instructor at Columbia University who is a member of the Havemeyer family, and Alice Rich Northrop, a teacher of botany at Hunter College. His father died in a lab explosion two weeks before John H. Northrop was born. The son was educated at Yonkers High School and Columbia University, where he earned his BA in 1912 and PhD in chemistry in 1915. During World War I, he conducted research for the U.S. Chemical Warfare Service on the production of acetone and ethanol through fermentation. This work led to studying enzymes.

=== Research ===
In 1929, Northrop isolated and crystallized the gastric enzyme pepsin and determined that it was a protein. For this achievement, he was elected to the United States National Academy of Sciences in 1934. In 1938 he isolated and crystallized the first bacteriophage (a small virus that attacks bacteria), and determined that it was a nucleoprotein. He was elected to the American Philosophical Society that same year. Northrop also isolated and crystallized pepsinogen (the precursor to pepsin), trypsin, chymotrypsin, and carboxypeptidase.

For his 1939 book, Crystalline Enzymes: The Chemistry of Pepsin, Trypsin, and Bacteriophage, Northrop was awarded the Daniel Giraud Elliot Medal from the National Academy of Sciences. He was elected a Fellow of the American Academy of Arts and Sciences in 1949. Northrop was employed by the Rockefeller Institute for Medical Research in New York City from 1916 until his retirement in 1961. In 1949 he joined the University of California, Berkeley as Professor of Bacteriology, and later, he was appointed Professor of Biophysics.

=== Personal life ===
In 1917, Northrop married Louise Walker (1891–1975), with whom he had two children: John, an oceanographer, and Alice, who married Nobel laureate Frederick C. Robbins. The family lived in a small home just outside of Mt. Vernon, New York. As their children grew older and Northrop looked for a more desirable workplace, the family bought a home in Cotuit, Massachusetts. This move shortened Northrop's commute to the laboratory in Princeton, New Jersey, and also put him in closer contact with the wilderness which he greatly enjoyed. Northrop committed suicide in Wickenburg, Arizona in 1987.
