= Alice Rich Northrop =

American botanist (1864-1922)

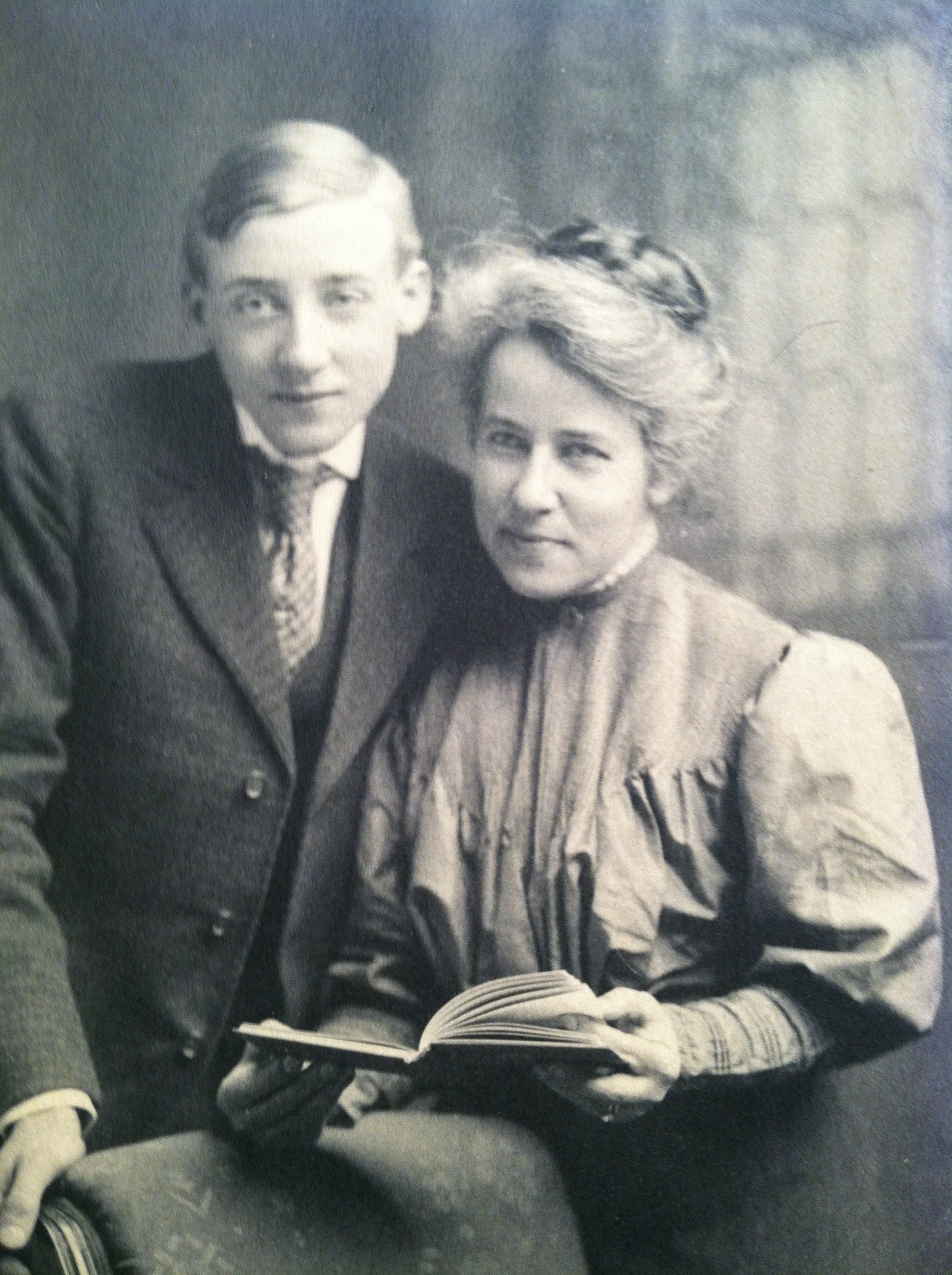
- Alice Rich Northrop with her son, John Howard Northrop
- Born: March 6, 1864; New York City, US
- Died: May 6, 1922 (aged 58); Mt. Riga, New York, US
- Education: Hunter College
- Known for: Expanding educational access
- Scientific career
- Fields: Botany

Alice Rich Northrop (March 6, 1864 – May 6, 1922) was an American botanist. She was known for expanding access to nature for New York City's public school children. Northrop traveled extensively to regions of the world where women did not usually venture, including Central America, the Caribbean, and Western North America. On a trip to the Bahamas, she and her husband, John Isaiah Northrop, discovered 18 new species. Her husband was killed in a laboratory accident in 1891, a week before their son was born.

Northrop became a professor of botany at Hunter College. Many of her students went on to teach in New York City public schools and reported to her that their students had very little access to nature. Northrop labored to increase education about the natural world, including installing terrariums and preserved plants in classrooms across the city. One lasting legacy of Northrop's life's work is the Alice Rich Northrop Memorial Camp in the Berkshire Mountains, which was established to allow children from the city to spend two weeks at a time on the farm. The first group of children came in 1923, and the camp continues to host school groups each summer.

Her son, John Howard Northrop, won the Nobel Prize in Chemistry in 1946. Her papers are held at the Schlesinger Library.

== Works ==
The standard author abbreviation Northr. is used to indicate this person as the author when citing a botanical name.

- A Naturalist in the Bahamas (ca. 1910, in conjunction with husband, John Isaiah Northrop)
- Through Field and Woodland, a guide to upland flora in New England (1925)
- Together with her husband she edited the exsiccata Bahama plants, collected and distributed by John I. and Alice R. Northrop.
