= Keith Ferrazzi =

American author and entrepreneur

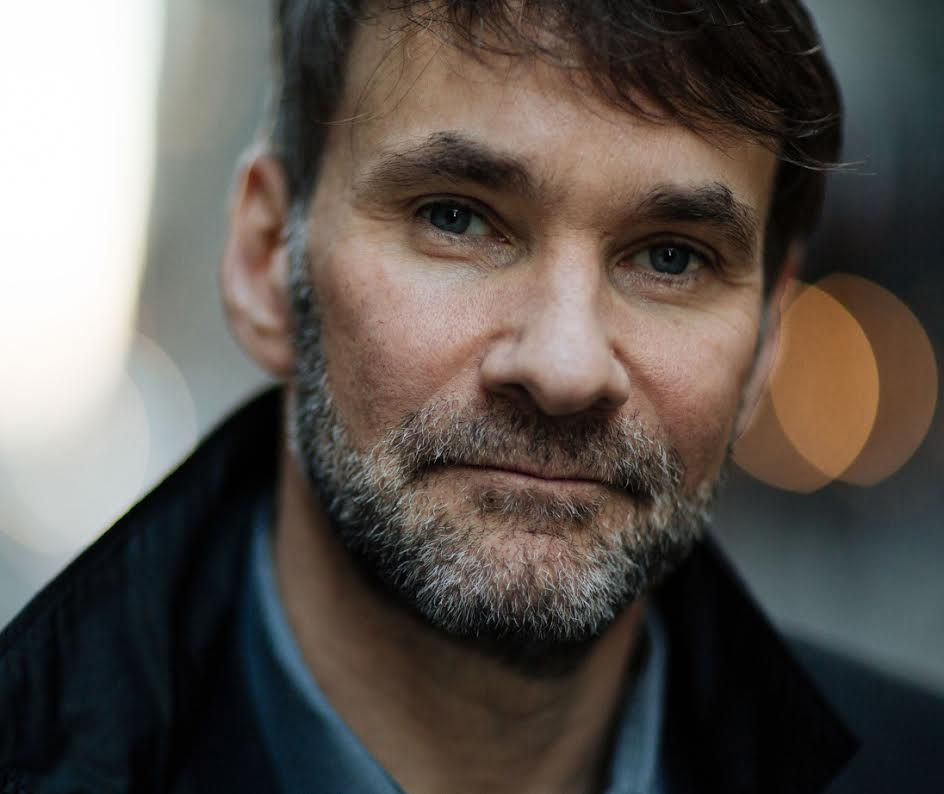
- Born: Pennsylvania
- Education: Yale University; Harvard Business School
- Occupations: Chairman & Founder of Ferrazzi Greenlight; Author; Entrepreneur; Executive coach
- Notable work: Never Eat Alone; Who's Got Your Back? Never Lead Alone: 10 Shifts from Leadership to Teamship
- Title: Ferrazzi Greenlight (Founder & CEO)
- Website: keithferrazzi.com

Keith Ferrazzi is an American author and entrepreneur. He is the founder and CEO of Ferrazzi Greenlight, a Los Angeles, California-based research and consulting firm. He wrote the New York Times bestselling books Never Eat Alone and Who's Got Your Back? Keith Ferrazzi first created the term co-elevation in 2017, as he was writing the book, Leading Without Authority: How Co-Elevation Is Redefining Collaboration and Transforming Our Teams, with the publisher Penguin Random House.

Ferrazzi has been recognized by Thinkers50, a London-based authority on management thinking, as one of the world's top 50 thinkers (2025) and was named to its inaugural Coaches50 list of the world's leading executive coaches (2024). He coaches senior leadership teams on collaboration, work redesign, and human-AI teaming."

== Early life and education ==
Ferrazzi was born and grew up in Pennsylvania. He attended Yale University, where he founded the Sigma Chi chapter there, and Harvard Business School.

== Career ==
After graduating from Harvard, he joined management consulting firm Deloitte as an entry-level analyst, and rose to become the company's chief marketing officer (CMO). At age 32, he was hired by Starwood as CMO, reportedly the youngest CMO in the Fortune 500 at the time. In 2000, he left to found YaYa Media, an entertainment and marketing company, which he sold to investment company American Vantage in 2003.

Ferrazzi left YaYa Media to found Ferrazzi Greenlight, a Los Angeles-based strategic consulting firm, and its associated Greenlight Research Institute. The company and institute focus on the importance of positive relationships to business success.

Ferrazzi Greenlight has since advised Fortune 500 executive teams, the World Bank, fast-growing unicorn companies, and government bodies including the Kingdom of Bhutan on leadership and team transformation.

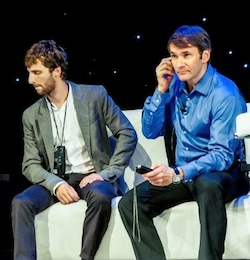
Keith Ferrazzi (right) with Alexey Kekulov in Moscow

== Books ==
Ferrazzi has written two networking books that were New York Times bestsellers.

His first book, Never Eat Alone, was based on his networking experiences, and was published in 2005.

His second book, Who's Got Your Back?, followed up and expanded on the themes from his first book, and was published in 2009.

In 2020, he wrote a new book, Leading Without Authority. Keith Ferrazzi discusses how "co-elevation" will transform peers into joint task teammates.

In 2022, he wrote Competing in the New World of Work: How Radical Adaptability Separates the Best from the Rest, which shows leaders how to shape their organizations and practices to remain competitive in a new, post-pandemic context.

In 2024, Ferrazzi published Never Lead Alone: 10 Shifts from Leadership to Teamship (Harper Business), which draws on findings from thousands of organizational diagnostics conducted by Ferrazzi Greenlight.

== Recognition ==
Ferrazzi has been named a Ranked Thinker by Thinkers50 (2025) and was included in the organization's inaugural Coaches50 list recognizing the world's most influential executive coaches (2024).

== Gallery ==
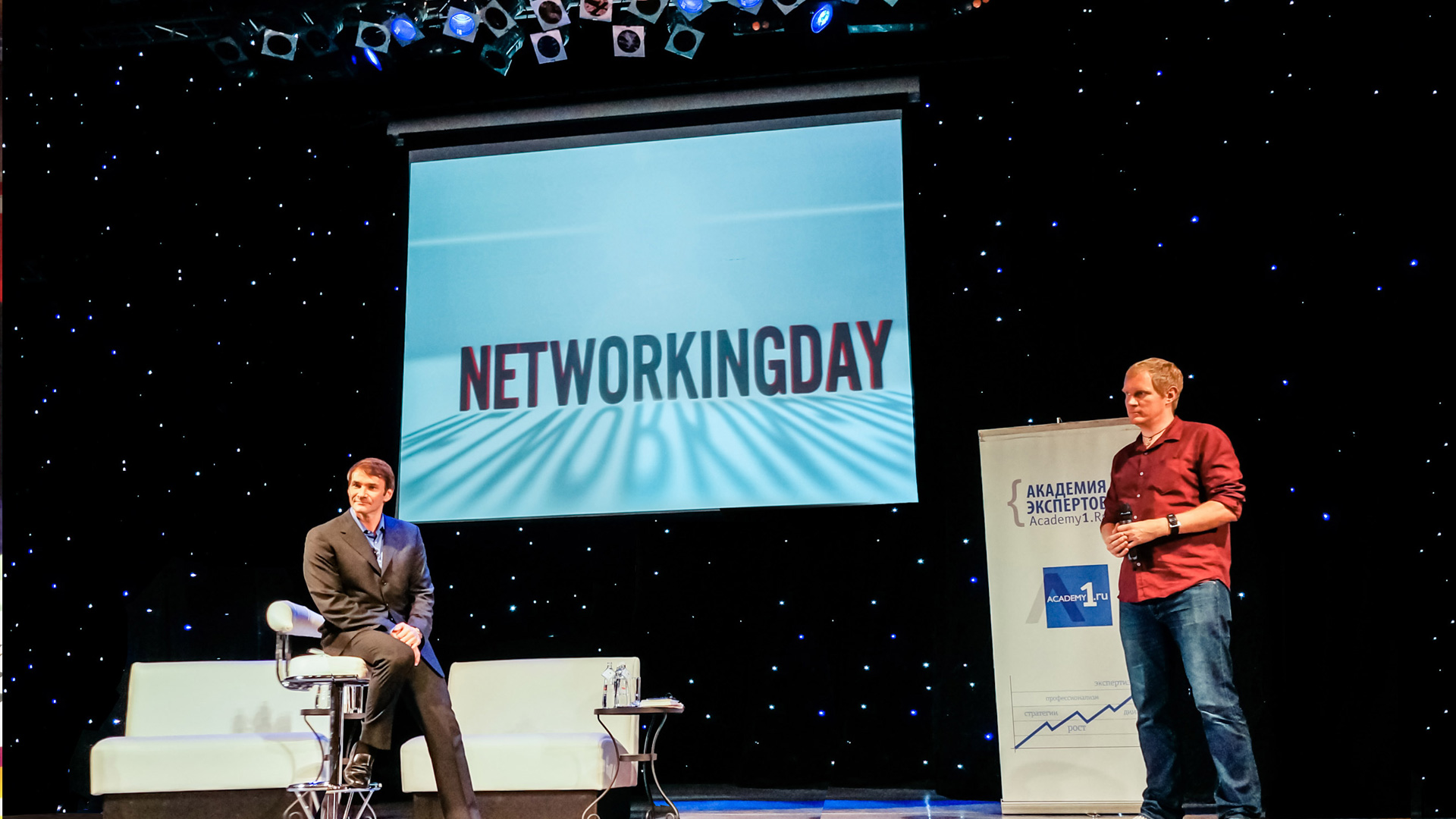
Keith Ferrazzi with Leonid Bugaev at networking event Networking Day 2012

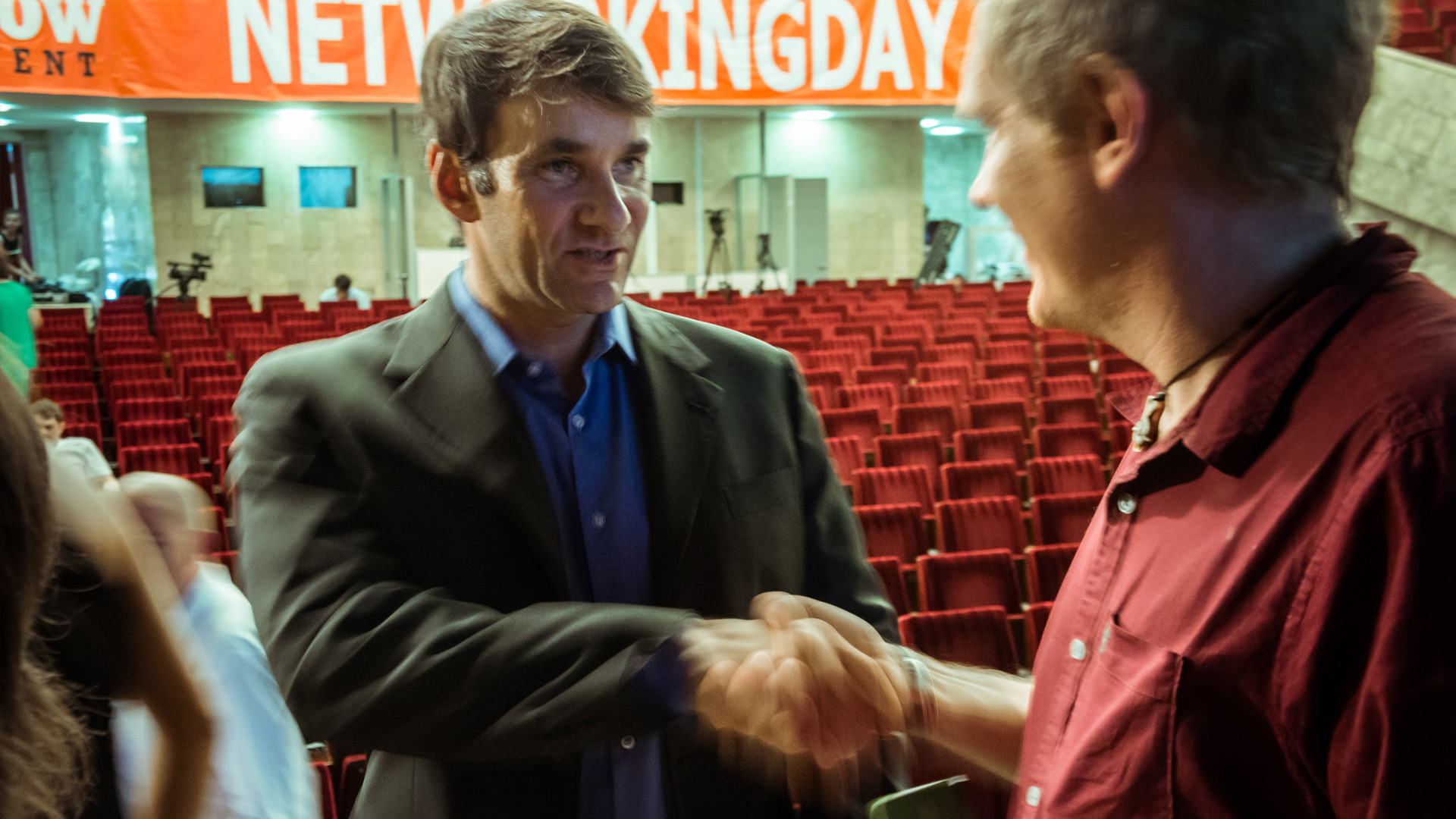
Keith Ferrazzi with Leonid Bugaev at networking event Networking Day 2012

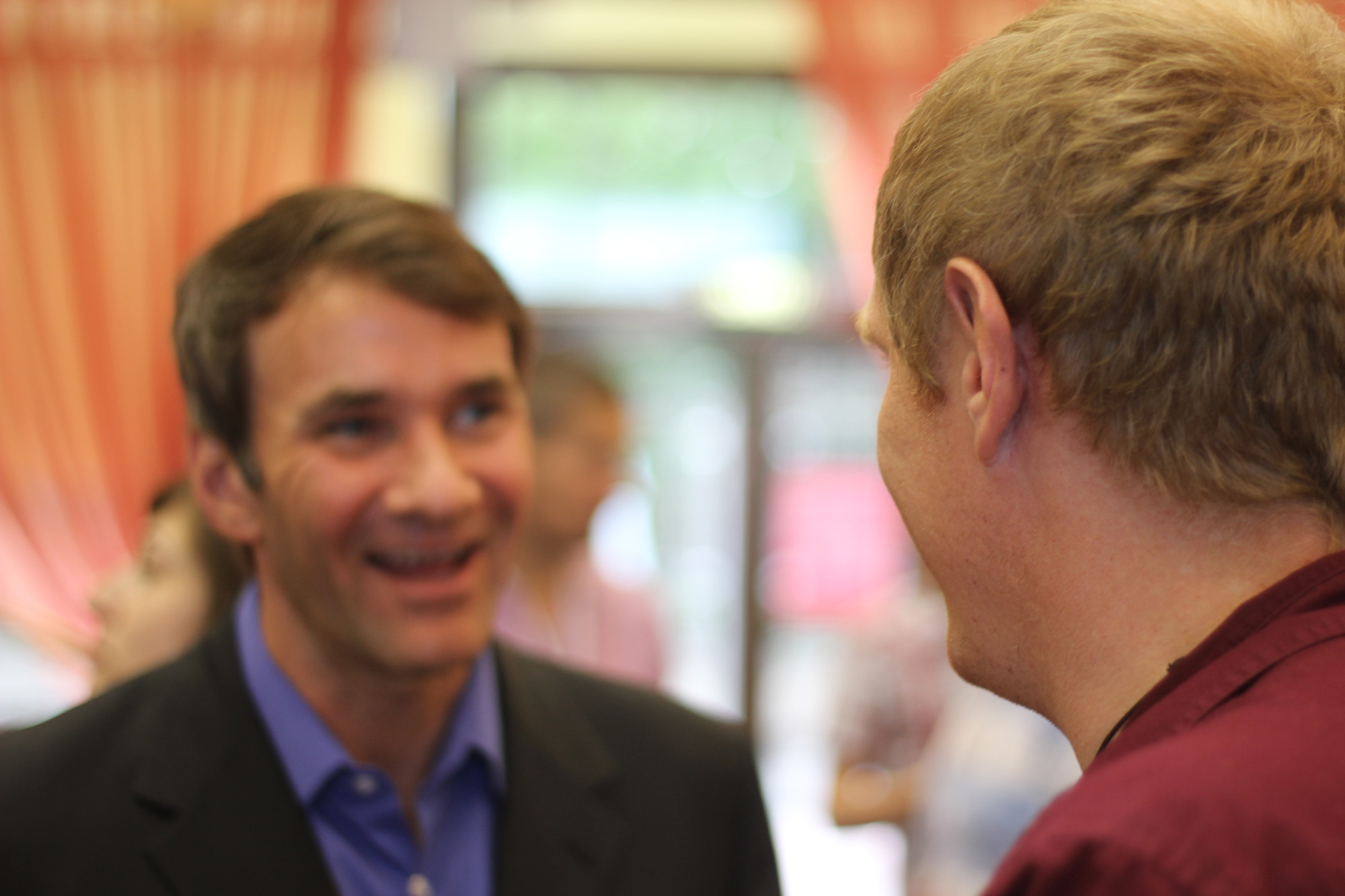
Keith Ferrazzi with Leonid Bugaev at networking event Networking Day 2012
