= Cameron Winslow =

United States Navy admiral

Cameron McRae Winslow
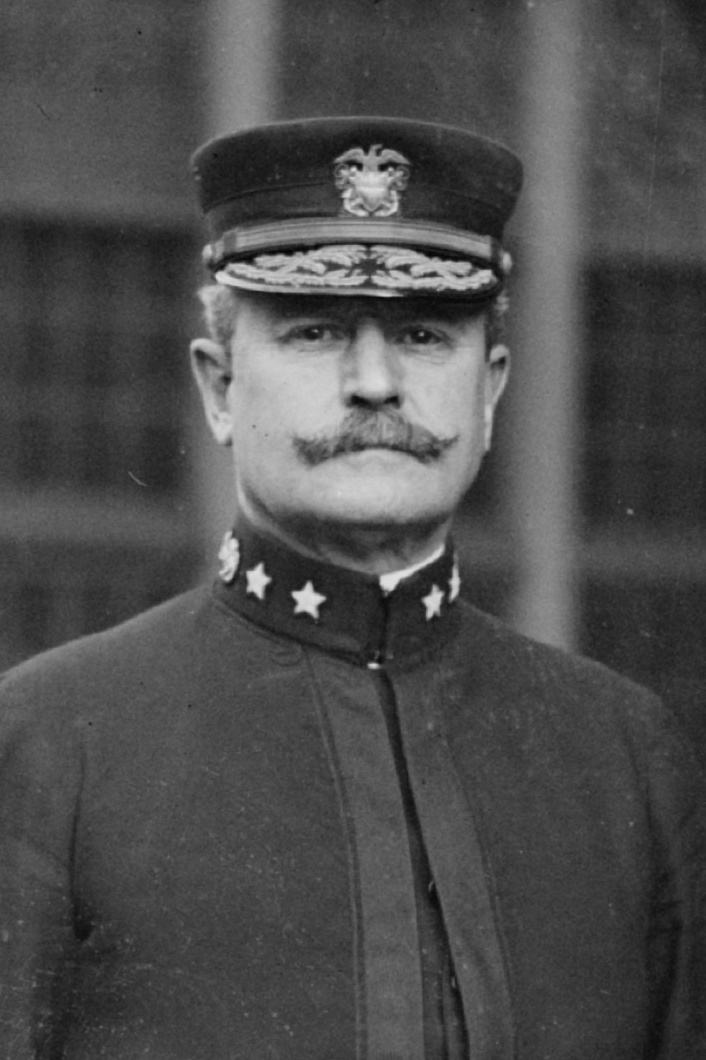
- Born: July 29, 1854; Washington, D.C., U.S.
- Died: January 2, 1932 (aged 77); Boston, Massachusetts, U.S.
- Education: United States Naval Academy
- Spouse: Theodora Havemeyer
- Relatives: John A. Winslow (cousin)
- Military career
- Allegiance: United States of America
- Branch: United States Navy
- Service years: 1874–1916, c. 1917–1919
- Rank: Admiral
- Unit: USS Nashville
- Commands: USS Charleston; USS New Hampshire; U.S. Pacific Fleet
- Conflicts: Spanish–American War; World War I

Cameron McRae Winslow (July 29, 1854 – January 2, 1932) served in the United States Navy during the Spanish–American War and World War I. He was a son of Commander Francis Winslow (I) (1818–1862), who fought in the Civil War and died of yellow fever in 1862 while in command of USS R. R. Cuyler.

He was a first cousin once removed of Rear Admiral John A. Winslow, who also served in the Civil War and is best known as the commanding officer of USS Kearsarge which defeated CSS Alabama.

== Early life ==
Cameron McRae Winslow was born in Washington, D.C. He was the son of Francis Winslow (1819–1862) and Mary Sophia (née Nelson) Winslow (1828–1903). His older brother was Lieutenant Francis Winslow (II) USN; his younger brother, Arthur Winslow, was the grandfather of the Pulitzer Prize-winning poet Robert Lowell. He graduated from the United States Naval Academy in 1874, after which followed years of extensive sea duty.

Winslow was the great great great grandson of Major General John Stark, a distinguished soldier from New Hampshire during the American Revolution. In 1915 he joined the New Hampshire Society of the Cincinnati with General Stark as his propositus.

== Naval career ==
During the 1898 war with Spain, then Lieutenant Winslow served on board the gunboat Nashville. He was commended for extraordinary heroism when, on May 11, 1898, he commanded a boat expedition from Nashville and Marblehead which succeeded in cutting two submarine cables off Cienfuegos, Cuba, which linked Cuba with Europe. Despite enemy fire from point-blank range, which resulted in a bullet wound to his hand, Winslow retained command throughout the engagement. At that time, regulations did not allow Navy officers to receive the Medal of Honor. However, all the enlisted sailors involved in the cable-cutting operation did receive the Medal of Honor.

Winslow commanded Charleston from 1905 to 1907 and battleship New Hampshire from 1908 to 1909. Winslow did not sail on the around-the-world cruise of the Great White Fleet. When the fleet returned to the US in 1909, Winslow and New Hampshire joined the fleet for its formal military review before President Roosevelt.

Promoted to rear admiral on September 14, 1911, Winslow was Commander in Chief, United States Pacific Fleet, from September 13, 1915 until July 29, 1916 when he was retired due to reaching the statutory age limit of 62. (While in command of the Pacific Fleet, he held four-star Admiral rank pursuant to a 1915 law that designated holders of certain commands to temporary 4-star rank; see List of United States Navy four-star admirals.)

Winslow was recalled to active duty in World War I with the rank of rear admiral. He served as Inspector of Naval Districts on the Atlantic coast until again retiring on November 11, 1919. While in this assignment, Winslow's flagship was USS Aloha, a private sailing yacht acquired by the Navy for use during the war.

=== Retirement ===
Following the 1908 death of his oldest brother, Lt. Francis Winslow (II) USN, Rear Admiral Winslow became a member of the Society of the Cincinnati in the State of New Hampshire, representing his direct ancestor Major General John Stark. The admiral's younger brother, Arthur Winslow, also joined the Society, representing the General's oldest son, Major Caleb Stark.

Winslow was also a member of the Military Order of Foreign Wars and the Naval Order of the United States.

== Personal life ==
He was married to Theodora Havemeyer (1878–1945), one of nine children born to sugar baron Theodore A. Havemeyer and Emilie (née de Loosey) Havemeyer. Theodora was the sister of Charles Frederick Havemeyer. Together, they were the parents of six children, three sons and three daughters, including:

- Cameron McRae Winslow Jr. (1901–1981), who graduated from the United States Naval Academy in 1924. Winslow Jr. received the Navy Cross for heroism while in command of the armed guard on board the S.S. Chi Ping from March 12 to March 14, 1930, on the Yangtze River, near Yichang, China. While moving on the river, the vessel was taken under heavy fire on several occasions from Chinese soldiers. Winslow returned fire promptly so that in each instance the attack was repulsed and the vessel permitted to continue its voyage. During an attack on 14 March, Winslow was struck in the thigh by a rifle bullet. He did not give up command of his detachment but continued firing a machine gun. In 1932 he succeeded his father as a hereditary member of the New Hampshire Society of the Cincinnati. He served in the early years of World War II and was retired from the Navy for medical reasons on April 1, 1943 with the rank of lieutenant commander. In retirement he lived in Newport, Rhode Island.
- Theodora Marie Winslow (1903–2007), who married Auguste Louis Noel (1884–1964), a Beaux-Arts architect. Their daughter, Carlotta Marie Noel, was married to Peter Van Courtlandt Morris (b. 1931), the son of Newbold Morris, president of the New York City Council.
- Arthur Winslow (1913–1987), who married Jean Douglas (1921–1951) in 1948.

Admiral Winslow died at his home, 205 Commonwealth Avenue in Boston, Massachusetts, on January 2, 1932.

=== Legacy ===
The first two ships named USS Winslow honored his cousin, Rear Admiral John Ancrum Winslow, and USS Winslow (DD-359) honored Rear Admiral Cameron McRae Winslow as well.

Admiral Winslow's full dress uniform is on display at the Artillery Company of Newport armory and museum in Newport, Rhode Island.

== Awards ==
- Sampson Medal
- Spanish Campaign Medal
- Mexican Service Medal
- World War I Victory Medal

== Dates of rank ==
- Midshipman – 29 September 1870
- Passed Midshipman – 21 June 1875
- Ensign – 18 July 1876
- Master – 21 December 1881
- Lieutenant, Junior Grade – 3 March 1883
- Lieutenant – 1 July 1888
- Lieutenant Commander – 3 March 1899
- Commander – 11 October 1903
- Captain – 28 January 1908
- Rear Admiral – 14 September 1911
- Admiral – 13 September 1915
- Retired – 29 July 1916

== See also ==
- Bibliography of early American naval history

Military offices
Preceded by Thomas B. Howard	Commander in Chief of the United States Pacific Fleet; 29 July 1916-30 April 1919	Succeeded by William B. Caperton
