= W. Butler Duncan =

Scottish-American banker and railroad executive (1830–1912)

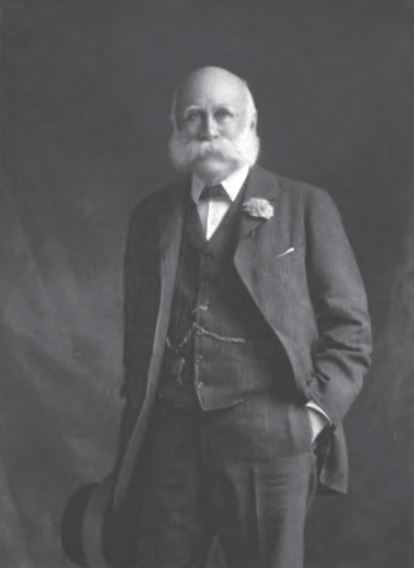

President of the Saint Andrew's Society of the State of New York
- In office 1902–1906
- Preceded by: Andrew Carnegie
- Succeeded by: Robert Frater Munro

Personal details
- Born: William Butler Duncan; 17 March 1830 Edinburgh, Scotland
- Died: 12 June 1912 (aged 82) New York City, New York, U.S.
- Spouse: Jane Percy Sargent (m. 1853; died 1905)
- Children: Jessie Percy Butler; Alexander Butler Duncan; Mary Butler Duncan; William Butler Duncan (adopted)
- Education: Brown University
- Occupation: Businessman, financier, philanthropist

William Butler Duncan (17 March 1830 – 12 June 1912) was a Scottish-American banker and railroad executive.

== Early life ==
Duncan was born in Edinburgh on 17 March 1830, a son of Sarah (née Butler) Duncan (1806–1888) and Alexander Duncan (1805–1889) of Parkhill Arbroath, Scotland, who married in 1827.

Among his siblings were Jessie Scott Duncan, Samuel Butler Duncan and Mary Cryder Duncan, who all died young; David Duncan (who married Fanny Bloodgood); Adele Granger Duncan (who married Robert Hamilton Stubber of Moyne, Ireland); Alexander Lauderdale Duncan of Knossington Grange, Leicestershire, England (who married Louisa Elizabeth Hunt); and Sally Duncan (who married Sir Robert Hay, 8th Baronet of Smithfield and Haystoun). His father came to America as a young man and graduated from Yale University in 1827.

After his younger brother David died in 1873 and his wife in 1874, Duncan adopted their young son, William Butler Duncan II (1862–1933).

The younger Duncan was a leader in American yacht racing and graduated from the United States Naval Academy in 1882. he served on the USS Yankee in the Spanish–American War.

Duncan was educated in Edinburgh and at Brown University.

== Career ==
After returning to New York City, he became a banker and from 1851 until 1875, he was a partner in the banking house of Duncan, Sherman & Company, the American representatives of George Peabody and Company. Banker J.P. Morgan apprenticed at the firm before establishing his own firm in New York.

From 1874 until 1888, he served as president of the Mobile and Ohio Railroad. When the railroad was acquired by the Southern Railroad Company in 1901, he became chairman of its board of directors, serving until his death in 1912.

Duncan was also a director of the Southern and Atlantic Telegraph Company and the U.S. Guarantee Company. He also served as vice-president of Butler Hospital, which was named in honor of Cyrus Butler, his mother's uncle. He was president of the Butler Exchange Company, a member of the National Academy of Design, the Metropolitan Museum of Art, and of the American Museum of Natural History.

== Personal life ==
On 22 November 1853, Duncan married Jane Percy Sargent (1833–1905) in New Orleans. Jane was the daughter of George Washington Sargent and Margaret Isabella Jessie (née Percy) Sargent and the granddaughter of Winthrop Sargent, the Governor of Mississippi Territory and Secretary of Northwest Territory. Together, they lived at 1 Fifth Avenue in New York City and were the parents of:

- Jessie Percy Butler Duncan (1855–1934), who married William Wilton Phipps of London; she received a damehood and was known as Dame Jessie Phipps.
- Alexander Butler Duncan (1858–1920), who married Eloise (née Stevenson) Kernochan (1872–1948), the widow of James Lorillard Kernochan and daughter of Vernon King Stevenson, in 1907.
- Mary Butler Duncan (1861–1922), who married Paul Dana, son of Charles Anderson Dana.

From 1858 to 1896, the Duncan family maintained a residence on Grymes Hill, Staten Island, in the former home of the neighborhood's namesake, Suzette Grymes.

At his mansion on Fifth Avenue, Duncan entertained the Prince of Wales in 1860 (before he became King Edward VII), and Prince Arthur, Duke of Connaught in 1868.

His wife died at their home on 11 December 1905. Duncan died in New York City on June 12, 1912.
