= Henry Osborne Havemeyer =

American businessman (1847–1907)

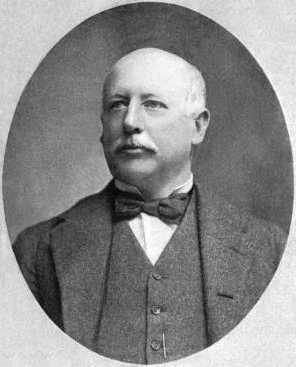

President of the American Sugar Refining Company
- In office 1891–1907

Personal details
- Born: October 18, 1847 Manhattan, New York City, U.S.
- Died: December 4, 1907 (aged 60) Commack, New York, U.S.
- Spouse: Louisine W. Elder
- Children: 3
- Relatives: Havemeyer family
- Education: Bellport Academy
- Occupation: Industrialist, entrepreneur
- Known for: Establishment of Sugar Trust; Art bequests

Henry Osborne Havemeyer (October 18, 1847 – December 4, 1907), also known as H. O. Havemeyer, was an American industrialist who was founder and president of the American Sugar Refining Company, through which he dominated the American sugar refining industry. He was one of the richest men in the United States, and at the time of his death, his estate was valued at over $18.5 million (approximately $453 million in 2024). With his wife, Louisine, he was also a prolific art collector and one of the earliest American collectors of impressionist pieces, guided by Mary Cassatt.

== Early life and education ==
Henry Osborne Havemeyer was born in New York City on October 18, 1847, the eighth of nine children, to Frederick Christian Havemeyer Jr. (1807–91) and Sarah Louise (née Henderson) Havemeyer (1812–51). His mother died when Henry was three years old, and he was raised with the help of his grandmothers, Mary Osborne Henderson and Catharine Billiger Havemeyer, and his eldest sister, Mary. The family lived at 193 West 14th Street in Chelsea, Manhattan, in what was then the northern frontier of urban New York City.

By the time of Henry's birth, the Havemeyer family had already established a major sugar baking and refining business in New York City. Beginning with the 1799 arrival of William Havemeyer from Bückeburg and 1807 establishment of an independent bakery on Budd Street, the Havemeyer family business had expanded significantly, with Henry's father Frederick becoming partner in 1828. In 1842, Frederick Havemeyer's cousin and business partner, William Frederick Havemeyer, was elected mayor of New York City. In 1856, the business was relocated to Williamsburg, establishing a steam sugar refinery.

=== Education ===
In 1854, Henry and his elder brother Thomas, age nine, were sent to the Bellport Academy in Long Island, under the charge of Mr. James Cruikshank. After one year there, Henry followed his older brother Theodore to Mr. Betts' School in Stamford, Connecticut. He was a difficult, short-tempered student. After a fight with the principal, he left the school, and his formal schooling ended at the age of eight.

== Business career ==
=== Havemeyers & Elder (1863–87) ===
==== Apprentice (1863–68) ====
In 1863, Frederick Havemeyer reorganized the family business as Havemeyers & Elder, with Theodore A. Havemeyer as partner in charge of refinery operations and his son-in-law, J. Lawrence Elder, as partner in charge of the mercantile business. At the time, H. O. was a fifteen-year-old apprentice learning all aspects of the business, from testing sugar at the docks to complex refinery operations, including the carefully guarded family secrets of sugar boiling. He was subsequently apprentice to Elder, studying purchasing, sales and record keeping.

===== Partner (1869–84) =====
When Elder died suddenly in 1868, H. O. and Thomas Havemeyer took over the mercantile business and became partners in 1869. Their cousin, Charles H. Senff, also joined the partnership to manage refinery operations and construction with Theodore.

By the time H. O. became a partner, the Williamsburg refinery known as the Yellow Sugar House had doubled in size, covering the East River waterfront from South 2nd Street to South 5th Street. Modern innovations were introduced, such that sugar was refined with great efficiency. By 1876, Thomas was no longer involved in the business, leaving H. O. as the principal partner in charge of the mercantile business.

On January 8, 1882, the refinery was completely destroyed by fire at a loss of $1.5 million (approximately $42 million in 2024). The partners (Frederick, Theodore, H. O. and Charles Senff) agreed to devote the family's entire financial resources to constructing a large state-of-the-art refinery. The new refinery was designed by Theodore, Charles Senff, and refinery superintendent Ernest Gerbracht and built of completely fireproof materials—brick and iron, with electric lights replacing more hazardous gas lights. The refinery reopened in January 1884 with a capacity to refine three million pounds of sugar per day.

=== American Sugar Refining ===
==== Formation (1887–1895) ====
After the American Civil War, growth in the sugar refining industry led to overproduction, slim profit margins, and a high degree of competition. Large refiners like Havemeyers & Elder produced sugar so efficiently and in such great quantities that supply outstripped demand. Smaller, less efficient refineries that could not run at full capacity failed. In the face of the highly competitive post-war sugar market, many refiners sought to organize to control production and pricing. On October 27, 1887, after two years of negotiations, an agreement was reached to combine into a business trust called the Sugar Refineries Company.

By year's end, the trust had consolidated 17 of the 23 refineries operating in the United States, and a competition ensued to determine which refineries were most efficient and would remain in operation. By 1890, five refineries remained in operation; Havemeyers & Elder was the sole New York area refinery. In 1890, the legality of the mergers was challenged in New York state court in People of the State of New York v. North River Refining Company. In response to the challenge, the trust reorganized under a holding company, the American Sugar Refining Company, incorporated in New Jersey by attorneys Elihu Root and John Randolph Dos Passos on January 10, 1891.

==== Acquisitions and Spreckels price war (1889–91) ====
Havemeyer sought to bring the remaining six independent refineries into the trust. His chief obstacle was California refiner Claus Spreckels, who refused to join. Havemeyer responded with an aggressive price war, using a small California plant that the trust had acquired to undercut Spreckels's prices in the region. In retaliation, Spreckels opened a Philadelphia refinery in 1889, intending to undercut the trust's business in east. The price war continued for two years until 1891, when the two sides came to an agreement to respect each other's territory. In 1890, the McKinley Tariff eliminated duties on raw sugar imports, increasing profit margins. Thus, despite a period of severe competition, during which margins between the cost of raw materials and the price of refined sugar was at a low, the trust saw increased profits and continued to expand while distributing large dividends to shareholders through 1892.

In 1891, Havemeyer moved to acquire the three remaining Philadelphia refineries. The acquisition of E. C. Knight Company led to the landmark United States Supreme Court case United States v. E. C. Knight Co. (1895), in which the Court ruled in favor of the trust on the grounds that sugar refining was manufacturing and not within the ambit of the commerce clause, meaning that the merger was not subject to federal government intervention or the Sherman Antitrust Act.

==== Congressional investigation and criminal trial ====
On June 12, 1894, Havemeyer testified before a special committee of the United States Senate appointed to investigate the trust. He admitted frankly to lobbying on behalf of his interests, which he claimed was within his rights and was common practice. However, Havemeyer refused a request from Nebraska senator William V. Allen to review all of the company's political contributions in 1892–93. At his second appearance before the committee, Havemeyer declined to submit his company's books for examination or to answer any further questions. He was brought to trial for contempt of Congress for refusing to answer. In 1897, he was found not guilty and the indictment was dismissed.

==== Arbuckle price war (1899–1901) and ====
In 1898, Pittsburgh merchant and grocer John Arbuckle sought to enter the sugar market. Arbuckle had innovated in the automated packaging of coffee beans, coating his beans in a mixture of Irish moss, isinglass, gelatine, sugar and eggs to preserve flavor and enrich coffee, making him the leading coffee seller in the United States. Arbuckle had extended his practices to repackaging sugar bought from American Sugar Refining. However, in 1898, Arbuckle moved to produce his own sugar and built a refinery in Brooklyn, creating a fierce competition with Havemeyer. Havemeyer retaliated by purchasing a controlling interest in the Woolson Spice Company, a coffee seller based in Toledo, Ohio, to undercut Arbuckle. Arbuckle retaliated by lowering his prices on sugar. The competition continued for three years until it was ended by mutual agreement in 1901.

The Arbuckle price war severely impacted smaller independent refineries, and Havemeyer took advantage by acquiring three independent firms (Mollenhauers Refinery in Brooklyn, National Sugar Company in Yonkers, and New York Refining Company in Long Island City). He did so anonymously, using James H. Post of the independent sugar brokerage B. H. Howell, Son & Co. as an intermediary. On May 31, 1900, the three refineries were consolidated into the National Sugar Refining Company of New Jersey, with Post as president and Howell & Co. handling its mercantile business. Although nominally independent, the trust owned half its stock and the new company received preferential treatment from the trust.

==== Expanding globally (1902–06) ====
While dominating the sugar market in the eastern United States, Havemeyer expanded the trust's holdings westward and internationally. In 1892, Havemeyer made his first investment in Cuban raw sugar by personally investing (along with Charles Senff and Edwin Atkins) in Trinidad Sugar Company. In 1906, following the Spanish–American War and United States military occupation of Cuba, he formed the Cuban American Sugar company, consolidating five Cuban raw sugar manufacturers.

Havemeyer also expanding the trust's holdings in the sugar beet industry, which was the primary source of raw sugar in the western United States. In 1902, he consolidated four small Utah factories into the Amalgamated Sugar Company. Working with the Church of Jesus Christ of Latter-day Saints, he also revitalized the Utah-Idaho Sugar Company. In 1905, he consolidated a group of small Colorado sugar factories into the Great Western Sugar Company. The trust also acquired interests in the Michigan Sugar Company, the Continental Sugar Company, and his former rival, Spreckels Beet Sugar Company of California.

==== 1907 customs fraud case ====
In November 1907, two weeks before Havemeyer's death, the docks at the Havemeyer plant in Brooklyn were raided by the U.S. Treasury agents, revealing that the scales that were used to weigh incoming raw sugar had been tampered with by inserting a concealed spring, permitting the firm to underpay its import duties. Special customs agents Richard Parr and James O. Brzezinski had been tipped off by a disgruntled employee. After Havemeyer's death, a criminal case against the company was brought to New York federal court in 1908 by district attorney Henry L. Stimson and Felix Frankfurter, which resulted in a victory for the government. To avoid an impending civil lawsuit and further negative publicity, the trust agreed to settle the case for $2 million (approximately $49 million in 2024) in back payments. Individual officers were tried separately for criminal involvement. In 1909, dock foreman Oliver Spitzer was convicted for attempted bribery, and superintendent Ernest Gerbracht, secretary Charles R. Heike, and five company checkers were also convicted.

== Musical interests ==
Havemeyer was an amateur violinist. He was a student of noted violinist Frederick Mollenhauer. It was his daily recreation and he would frequently play for three hours a day. Henry and Louisine Havemeyer held regular Sunday musicales at their home at 1 East 66th Street.

Henry Osborne and other members of the family were major collectors of instruments. Some of the most important instruments they collectively owned were two violins: the 1723 Stradivari 'Kiesewette' (played by Maxim Vengerov, Ilya Gringolts, Stefan Jackiw, Philippe Quint and most recently Augustin Hadelich), 1737 Guarneri 'del Gesù' "King Joseph", and three cellos: 1711 Stradivari "Duport" (ex-Rostropovich), 1714 Stradivari "Batta" (ex-Piatigorsky and most recently on loan to the Metropolitan Museum of Art) and the 1743 Guadagnini "Havemeyer".

== Art collecting and Patronage ==
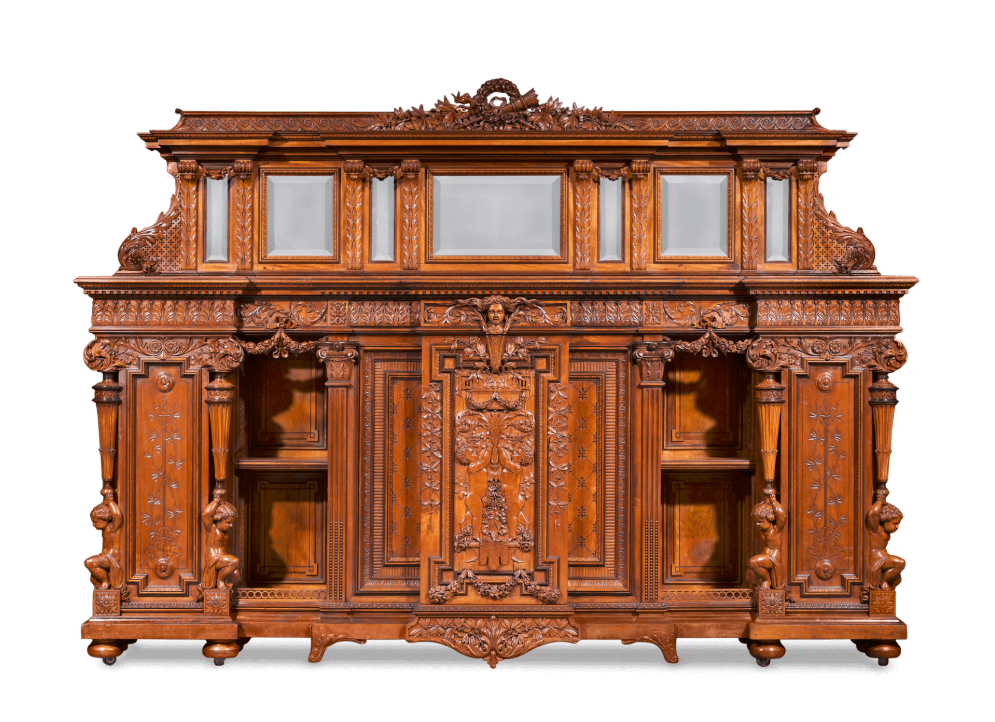
Sideboard by Pottier & Stymus owned by Henry Osborne Havemeyer. Circa 1875-1885

Havemeyer's first art purchases were made during his visit in 1876 to the Centennial Exhibition in Philadelphia with Samuel Colman. He bought carved ivory figures, Japanese lacquered boxes, silk, brocades, and sword guards. Typically his purchases were impulsive, numerous, and deeply personal. Both Henry and Louisine had distinct tastes for art collecting that largely complemented each other. Both Henry and Louisine had to be in agreement as to an object's worth for it to enter their now legendary collection. Louisine focused on collecting modern works by European painters, including the then-unappreciated Impressionists. She was most influenced by her close friend Mary Cassatt, who encouraged her to buy works by Edgar Degas and Claude Monet. Louisine would make 33 transatlantic crossings, returning from each major trip with a bounty of great western art.

In her will, Louisine identified some 142 works as a bequest to the Metropolitan Museum of Art, and empowered her children to give the museum's curators free rein. By the time they had finished an inventory of the Havemeyer's three-story Fifth Avenue home 1,967 works would be assimilated into the Met's holdings, identified as the H. O. Havemeyer Collection. The Havemeyer collection is represented throughout the galleries, but notably by the sheer volume of works present in the Impressionist collection. Some choice works from the Havemeyer collection are on view at the Shelburne Museum and the University of Michigan Museum of Art.

== Homes ==
=== Hilltop, Greenwich, CT ===
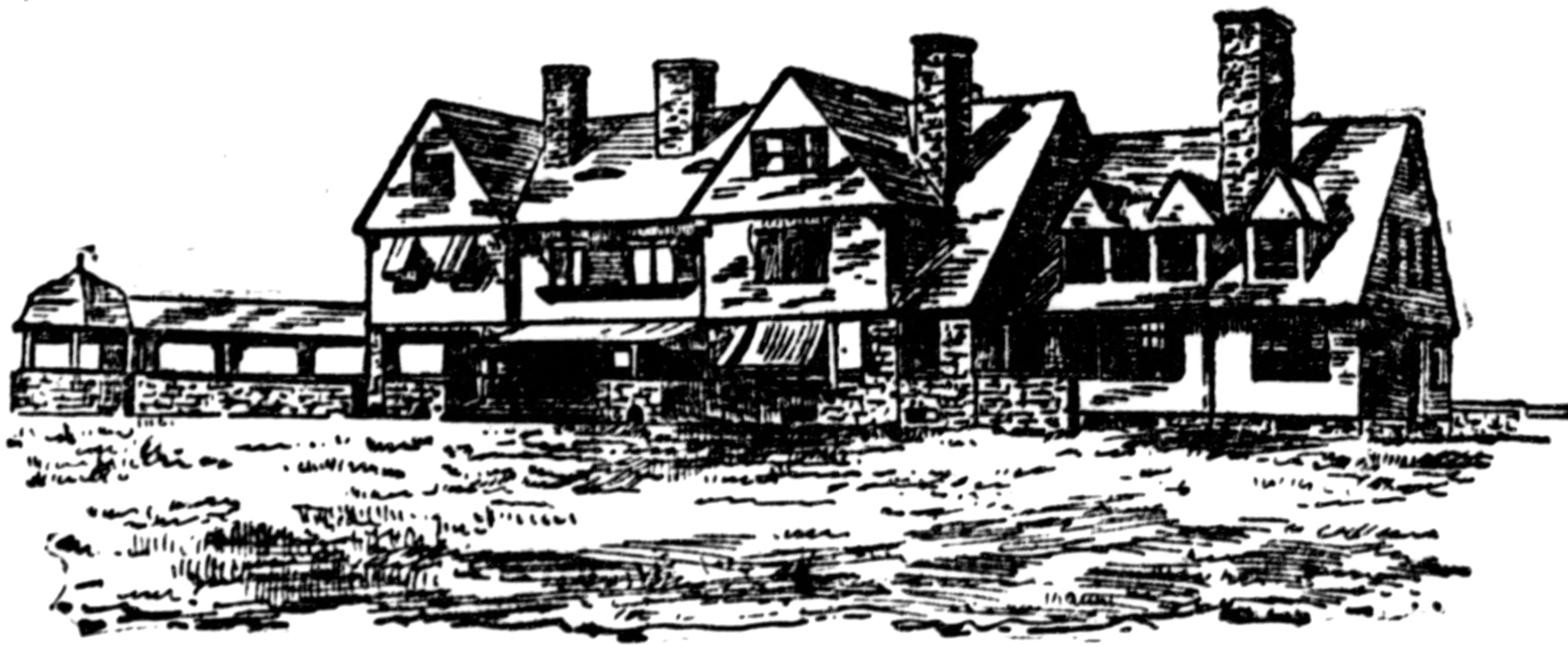
Hilltop, Greenwich, CT

In 1889 Havemeyer purchased 90 acres on Palmer Hill Road in Greenwich, Connecticut, on which to build a country home. The parcel had been owned by the Palmer and Quintard families for many generations, and was located to the north of Boston Post Road, east of the Mianus River, including 200 virgin acres at Mianus Ridge and Valley. The house was called Hilltop and had a view of Long Island Sound. It was designed by Boston firm Peabody and Stearns, three stories high with numerous facades, high gables, and six large chimneys. Samuel Colman designed the interiors and furnishings. Walls were covered with Japanese papers. The dining room was modeled after 17th Century Dutch paintings. The library was the principal room adorned with bookshelves, paintings and musical instruments. Superintendent James Troy managed the property, which included barns for horses, cows and pigs. The stables complemented the architecture of the house. There were three long greenhouses and acres of fruit trees and vegetable gardens. Figs were grown, as were orchids and gardenias. A grapery produced Concord grapes, both purple and light green, which won prizes at the Madison Square Garden flower show. The head gardener was George Morrow.

=== 1 East 66th Street ===
In 1889 the Havemeyers purchased land at the corner of 66th Street and Fifth Avenue and hired architect Charles Coolidge Haight (1841-1917) to design a building for their residence. Built in the Romanesque Revival style, the residence was four stories high with a round turreted bay at the corner. To design the interiors of the home, the Havemeyers hired the interior design firm of Louis Comfort Tiffany and Samuel Colman. Construction of the building was complete in 1890; the interiors were finished by 1892. A work of art in their own right, the interiors were designed as a harmonious environment in which to display the Havemeyers collections of Asian art, Islamic pottery, Dutch and Impressionist paintings.

Tiffany and Colman designed every detail of the interior and its furnishings. They were inspired by the exotic cultures of the Near and Far East. Each room was thematically unique and covered with sumptuous materials, such as embroidered silks and Tiffany-designed glass tiles. Many of the materials used, including in the leaded-glass windows, light fixtures, mosaics and balustrades. were fabricated at the Tiffany Glass and Decorating Co., and the interiors displayed Tiffany's "genius as a colorist and a luminist." Islamic-themed mosaics covered the walls of the front hall. Chinese embroidered silk hangings covered the walls of the reception room. Japanese silk brocade panels were assembled by Coleman from the pieces Havemeyer had bought from the Centennial Exhibition in 1876. These fabric panels adorned the ceiling in Havemeyer's library, which was called the Rembrandt Room as it housed his collection of Dutch paintings. In the music room, where the Sunday musicales were held, walls were hung with Chinese embroideries and lit by a magnificent Tiffany-designed chandelier, inspired by the wildflower Queen Anne's lace and made of clusters of opalescent blown-glass balls. The most spectacular element of the home was the flying staircase, inspired by that of Venice's Doge's Palace. It connected a balcony that circled the upper half of the two-story picture gallery to the room below. Suspended from the ceiling by sparkling chains and fringed with crystal, the stairs floated on a curved piece of cast iron and would tinkle when crossed. The house was torn down after Louisine Havemeyer's death in 1929. Some parts of the house are in the collection of the University of Michigan Museum of Art.

The carriage house and stables were located at 126 East 66th Street, west of Third Avenue, designed in 1895 by Havemeyer's cousin William J. Wallace and S.E. Gage and later owned by John Hay Whitney.

=== Islip, Long Island ===
The Havemeyers spent the months of July and August in Islip, Long Island, where Havemeyer sailed on the Great South Bay. In 1890 they bought property on St. Mark's Lane in Islip, Long Island, next door to Louisine Havemeyer's sister and brother-in-law, Adaline and Samuel T. Peters. In 1900 the Havemeyers moved into the Bayberry Point community that Havemeyer had developed, occupying the southwesterly house. Havemeyer owned a Herreshoff 30 named Electra which he raced in the Great South Bay.

=== Merrivale Farm, Commack, Long Island ===
Havemeyer purchased 500 acres in Commack, Long Island, neighboring the racetrack of Carll S. Burr, who was engaged in breeding and training of trotting horses. Havemeyer was an avid hunter of ducks and other game birds. He owned a large stable of trotting horses and established a pheasant shooting preserve on land nearby.

== Philanthropy ==
Havemeyer was a trustee of the American Museum of Natural History He and his brothers gave Havemeyer Hall for a School of Mines to Columbia University as a memorial for their father Frederick C. Havemeyer Jr. who studied at Columbia College from 1821 to 1823. Havemeyer gave a school to the Town of Greenwich, Connecticut.

== Personal life and death ==
=== Marriages and children ===
In March 1870, Havemeyer was married to Mary Louise Elder. Mary Louise, known as Louise, was the sister of his brother-in-law, J. Lawrence Elder. It was a short and unhappy marriage. They were divorced in 1882, with no children.

On August 22, 1883, Havemeyer married for the second time to Louisine Elder, the 28-year-old daughter of George and Matilda Elder. They had three children:

- Adaline Havemeyer (1884–1963), married to Peter H. B. Frelinghuysen in 1907
- Horace Havemeyer (1886–1956), married to debutante Doris A. Dick, a daughter of J. Henry Dick
- Electra Havemeyer (1888–1960), a major art collector married to James Watson Webb II in 1910

=== Death ===
Havemeyer died on December 4, 1907 in Commack, New York after a sudden illness. He was at Merrivale Farm with his son for Thanksgiving pheasant hunt. Louisine remained in New York City to be by her dying mother's bedside. After Thanksgiving lunch, Havemeyer was stricken with acute indigestion. The local doctor was called, but could not help. His wife and daughter Electra arrived the next morning with three New York City doctors; however, Havemeyer was beyond help. He lived for five days before dying at 3 p.m. on December 4. The cause of death is thought to be peritonitis, as a consequence of undetermined digestive failure, and subsequent kidney failure. Funeral services were held at his home at 1 East 66th Street officiated by Rev. Dr. R. Heber Newton, an Episcopal priest. Havemeyer was buried at Green-Wood Cemetery.

At the time of his death, Havemeyer's estate was valued at a gross value of over $18.5 million (approximately $453 million in 2024). The estate had appreciated to approximately $28.8 million (approximately $492 million in 2024) by 1937, when it was distributed to his three heirs, Horace, Electra, and Adaline. Robert F. Wagner and Vanderbilt Webb served as special guardians of the trust.

== See also ==
- Havemeyer family
- Havemeyer
