= USS Aloha =

Patrol vessel of the United States Navy

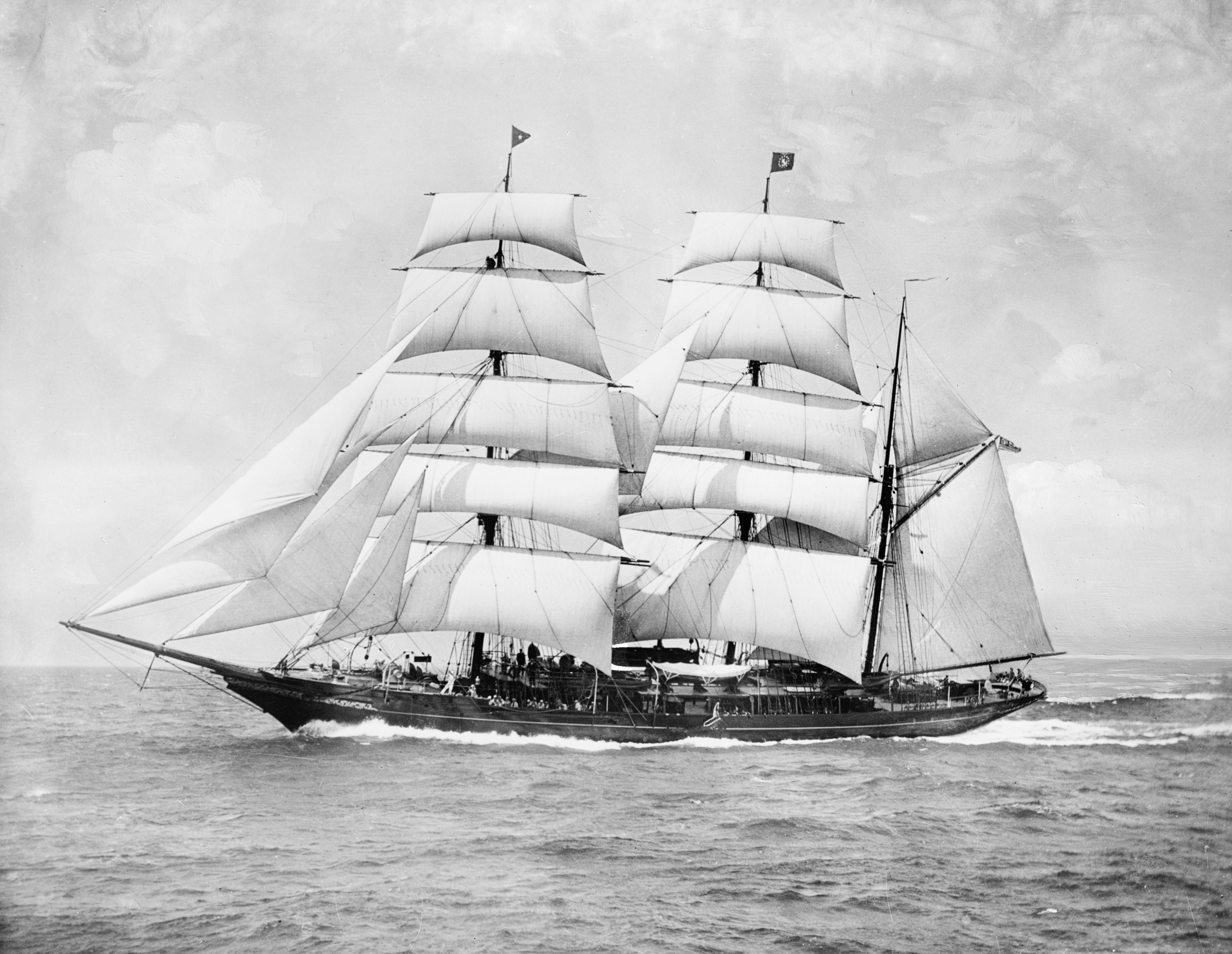
- Aloha as a private yacht, under full sail.

History

United States
- Name: USS Aloha
- Namesake: Aloha, a Hawaiian word meaning "hello," "farewell," and "love" (previous name retained)
- Builder: Fore River Shipbuilding Company, Quincy, Massachusetts
- Completed: 1910
- Acquired: 22 April 1917
- Commissioned: 5 June 1917
- Decommissioned: 29 January 1919
- Fate: Returned to owner 29 January 1919
- Notes: Served as private yacht Aloha 1910-1917 and 1919-1938; scrapped 1938

General characteristics
- Type: Naval trawler (minesweeper)
- Tonnage: 659 Gross register tons
- Length: 218 ft 0 in (66.45 m)
- Beam: 35 ft 0 in (10.67 m)
- Draft: 16 ft 0 in (4.88 m)
- Installed power: 410 indicated horsepower (0.55-megawatt)
- Propulsion: Sails and one triple-expansion Steam engine; one shaft
- Sail plan: bark-rigged
- Speed: 12 knots under steam
- Complement: 79
- Armament: 2 × 3-inch (76.2-millimeter) guns; 2 × depth charges; 2 × 4-inch (102-millimeter) guns added August–October 1918

USS Aloha (SP-317) was a United States Navy patrol vessel in commission from 1917 to 1919.

== Construction, acquisition, and commissioning ==
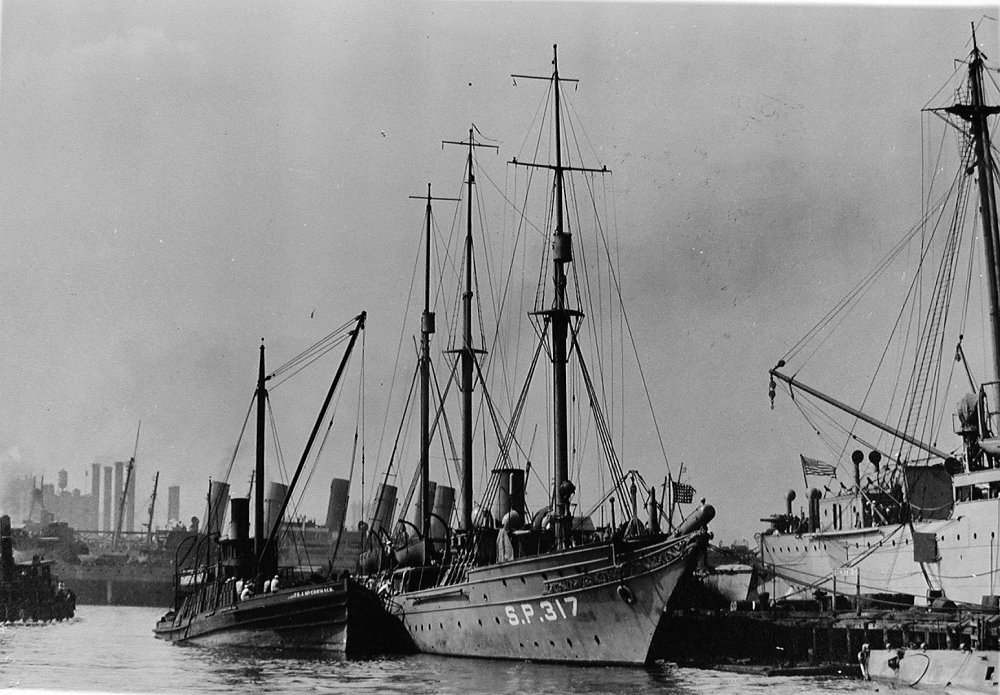
USS Aloha (center) at the New York Navy Yard in Brooklyn, New York, on 2 October 1917, while serving as the flagship of Rear Admiral Cameron McRae Winslow.

Aloha was built as a private steel-hulled, single-screw, bark-rigged steam yacht in 1910 by the Fore River Shipbuilding Company at Quincy, Massachusetts, for "Commodore" Arthur Curtiss James (1867–1941), an industrialist, railroad magnate, and yachtsman. She was the second yacht of the name built for James, was designed for ocean cruising, and had a large crew of 39. For her maiden voyage in 1910, James took her to England and Scotland. In 1911 he sailed her to Panama and Ireland, and to Egypt and the Near East in 1912 and 1913. The outbreak of World War I in Europe in July 1914 curtailed his voyages.

On 22 April 1917, after the United States had entered the war earlier that month, the U.S. Navy acquired Aloha from James under a free lease for use as a patrol vessel during the war. She was commissioned on 5 June 1917 as USS Aloha (SP-317).

== Career ==
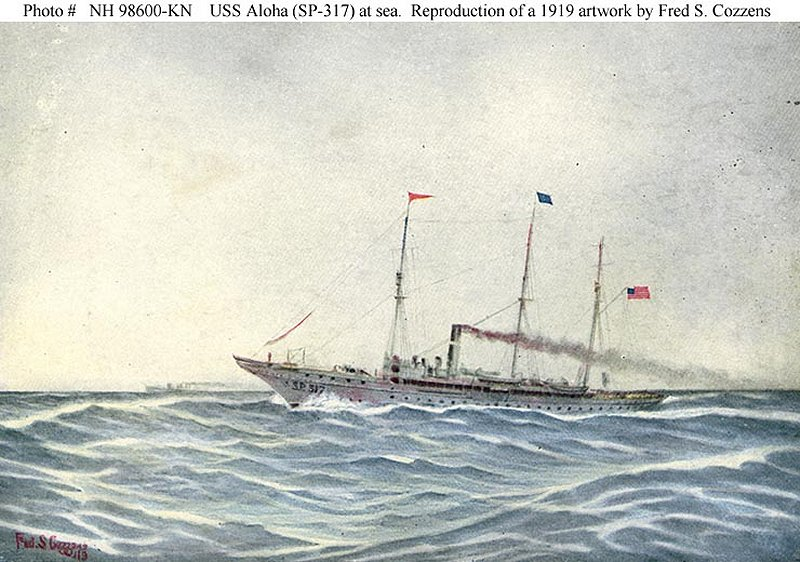
A halftone reproduction of a 1919 painting of USS Aloha at sea during World War I

Soon after commissioning, Aloha was assigned to serve as flagship for Rear Admiral Cameron McRae Winslow (1854–1932), Inspector of Naval Districts, East Coast.

No record of Aloha's activities during 1917 has survived.

On the morning of 1 January 1918, while Aloha lay moored at the Norfolk Navy Yard at Portsmouth, Virginia, a fire broke out in downtown Norfolk, which quickly spread to engulf almost two city blocks. The city's civil authorities soon requested help from the Navy, which dispatched men from Norfolk Naval Base and ships nearby. Aloha contributed 12 men under a Chief Boatswain's Mate Whalton to the efforts that ultimately succeeded in bringing the stubborn blaze under control, although not before it did US$2,000,000 in damage. The civil government, fearing "incendiaries", or German agents, suggested that naval guards were required, as well. Aloha sent a detachment of 15 sailors under an Ensign Hall, USNRF, on the morning of 2 January 1918 as the Navy placed Norfolk briefly under martial law in the wake of the blaze. They remained ashore only a short time before returning to their ship shortly before noon on 2 January.

Aloha remained at Norfolk until 23 February 1918, when she got underway with Rear Admiral Winslow embarked. She reached Key West on 28 February 1918. Over the next few months, Aloha touched at ports along the southeastern United States East Coast and on the United States Gulf Coast, ranging from Key West and Pensacola, Florida to Galveston, Texas, and New Orleans, Louisiana. Rear Admiral Winslow, usually accompanied by his aide, an Ensign Ackert, USNRF, and a Chief Yeoman Timmermann, conducted inspections of Coastal Air Station Miami and Naval Reserve Training Camp Miami at Miami; Naval Station New Orleans; the naval defenses of Tampa, Florida; Naval Station Jacksonville and the Jacksonville Navy Yard at Jacksonville; and the training camp at Charleston, South Carolina Aloha then underwent voyage repairs at Charleston from 15 April to 17 May 1918.

Aloha shifted to Hampton Roads, Virginia, on 20 May 1918, where Rear Admiral Winslow inspected the training camp at Naval Base Hampton Roads. On 22 May 1918, while Aloha lay anchored in Hampton Roads, a lighthouse tender hailed her and asked if she could care for an aviator she had picked up who had met with an accident. Fortunately, the pilot proved to be uninjured, so he was sent to Naval Aviation Base Norfolk by motor launch.

Aloha spent the remainder of May 1918 in the Tidewater region of Virginia before she departed for points north. She transferred Rear Admiral Winslow to patrol vessel USS Edorea (SP-549) on 1 June 1918, so he could inspect Naval Base Lewes at Lewes, Delaware, but he returned on board that afternoon. Aloha then coaled at the Philadelphia Navy Yard at Philadelphia on 3 June 1918 before returning to Hampton Roads, via Lewes, on 8 June 1918. She then cruised in the Hampton Roads and Chesapeake Bay area for the balance of June 1918 before heading north for New York City, where on 6 July 1918, Captain H. D. Hinckley of the United States Coast Guard relieved Lieutenant Swift as commanding officer.

Aloha spent much of the summer of 1918 in waters off the northeastern United States, at Port Jefferson, New York; New London, Connecticut; Newport, Rhode Island; Machias and Boothbay, Maine; Portsmouth, New Hampshire; and Gloucester, Massachusetts, before arriving at the Boston Navy Yard in Boston for a major refit on 27 August 1918. During this period of repairs and alterations, which lasted through September and October 1918, she received additional armament in the form of two 4-inch (102-millimeter) guns.

After departing the Boston Navy Yard on 5 November 1918, Aloha spent much of the ensuing passage to Shelburne, Nova Scotia, Canada, under sail and arrived at Shelburne on 7 November 1918. Returning to Boston on 10 November 1918, Aloha was lying moored there when the armistice with Germany ending hostilities was signed on 11 November 1918.

The remainder of Aloha's Navy career was spent alternately at Newport, Rhode Island, and at New London and New Haven, Connecticut, before she arrived back at New York City on 14 December 1918, shifting her berth to a point off Pier 72, East 25th Street, New York City, on 15 December 1918. She remained there until 10 January 1919.

== Decommissioning ==
Aloha entered the New York Navy Yard at Brooklyn, New York, on 10 January 1919. Shipyard workmen removed her guns on 11 January 1918. Returning to her anchorage off Pier 72, Aloha spent the next few days undergoing the initial stage of the transformation from warship to yacht in anticipation of her return to Arthur Curtiss James; her crew cleaned the ship, shined brightwork, and landed such paraphernalia as flag mess gear, chairs, and an oval table from the admiral's cabin at pier 72.

Her conversion back into a yacht was almost complete when, on 29 January 1919, her crew mustered aft and Captain Hinckley read the orders from the Commandant, 3rd Naval District, decommissioning Aloha. Down came the admiral's flag—Rear Admiral Winslow had maintained Aloha as his flagship to the very last moment—and the national colors, and a representative of James signed a receipt for the yacht.

== Later career ==
Over the ensuing months, James had Aloha converted back to her full, prewar splendor. During 1921 and 1922, he took her around the world; in 1925, she cruised the Mediterranean; in 1927, she went to England, the Baltic Sea, and the Netherlands; and in 1930, she again went to the Mediterranean. Aloha appeared at New York City during the Presidential Review of 31 May 1934.

Famous in her time and the only bark-rigged yacht of her size afloat, Aloha was scrapped in 1938.
