= Basil Durant =

American ballroom dancer

Basil Napier Durant (1889-1959) was an American ballroom dancer. Durant danced in vaudeville, and he performed at entertainment venues around the U.S. and Europe

== Early life and education ==
Durant was born to William West Durant and Janet Lathrop Stott in Saratoga Springs, New York on December 28, 1881. His father, William West, worked as an architect and achieved notoriety for his camp designs throughout New York State; many hotels in the Adirondack Mountain range feature his designs. The U.S. government named three of his camp designs as National Historic Landmarks. William West Durant's papers appear in both the Adirondack Museum Library and the Library of Congress in Washington, D.C.

Durant graduated from the Morristown School in Morristown, New Jersey in 1909. Starting a career, he entered the real estate business with William Clark Durant, a third cousin. They worked for the Grand Trunk Pacific Railway, a transcontinental railroad in Canada. Operated by Grand Trunk Railway, the railroad ran from Winnipeg to Prince Rupert, British Columbia, a city on the West Coast.

== Dancing career ==
Durant danced with Margaret Hawkesworth, a dancer from Washington, D.C., between 1914 and 1916. In May 1914, Durant and Hawkesworth danced at the Duchess de Talleyrand's palace on the Avenue Bois de Boulogne in Paris, France. The next month, French President Raymond Poincaré invited them to perform the latest American dances before him. Durant and Hawkesworth danced at the Parisian home of George Kessler, a German-American city planner and landscape architect. After returning to the U.S. on the Vaterland, they danced at a tea event hosted by speculator Arthur Curtiss James's wife. Durant and Hawkesworth danced the Moonlight Tango and the Fargo.

In April 1916, Durant and Hawkesworth debuted in vaudeville at the Palace Theatre in New York City. Their successful performance at a nightclub event at the Plaza Hotel helped make this possible. Durant and Hawkesworth danced before a midnight carnival with an audience of 2,000. Their dances from these two events included the Piping Rock One Step, the Valse Fantasy, the Pre-Catalan Tango, and the Plaza Trot.

During the 1920s, Durant performed at charity events. He danced at a circus event hosted by the Spence School's Alumni Association at the Ritz-Carlton Hotel in New York City in 1926.

== Tailor business ==
After his dancing career, Durant also ran a tailoring business called Basil Inc. on in Manhattan. His clients included General Motors executive Harley Earl, the designer of the Chevrolet Corvette and originator of concept cars. Durant later partnered with tailor Earl Van Sickle. They ran a joint shop called Sickle &Durant on Fifth Avenue and then East 53rd Street.

== Family ==
Durant married Virginia Claire Rigg on March 19, 1923 - page 1456 of new york, new york marriage license index, 1907-1995. After they divorced, he married Marjorie McCall (Shields) Durant in 1928.
