= Arthur Curtiss James =

American financier (1867–1941)

- Born: June 1, 1867
- Died: June 4, 1941 (aged 74)
- Education: Amherst College
- Spouse: Harriet Eddy Parsons
- Parent(s): Daniel Willis James; Ellen S. Curtiss

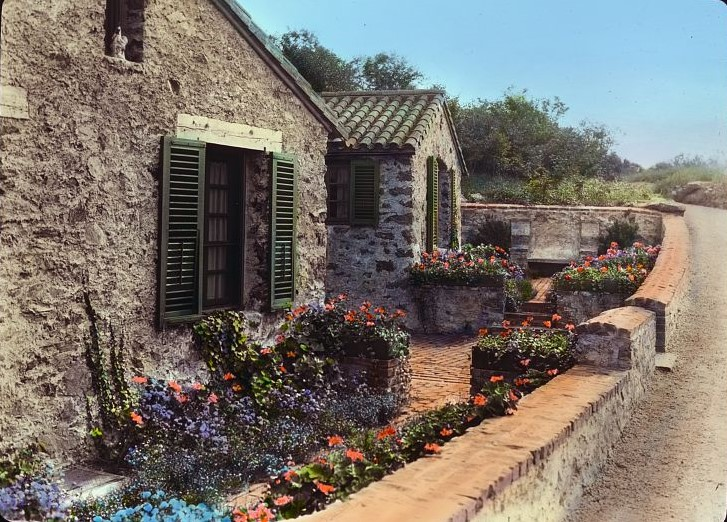
"Surprise Valley Farm," Arthur Curtiss James property, Beacon Hill Road, Newport, RI, by Frances Benjamin Johnston, 1917. Architect: Grosvenor Atterbury, 1914-1916. Today these buildings survive as part of the SVF Foundation founded to preserve endangered breeds of livestock

Arthur Curtiss James (June 1, 1867 – June 4, 1941) was a wealthy speculator in copper mines and railroads.

== Early life ==
He was the son of Daniel Willis James and Ellen S. Curtiss. His grandfather was Daniel James, one of the founders of Phelps, Dodge & Co. His grandmother was Elizabeth Woodbridge Phelps, daughter of Anson Green Phelps. James married Harriet Eddy Parsons in 1890. He graduated from Amherst College (Class of 1889).

== Business interests ==
For many years, Arthur Curtiss James was the largest stockholder in the Phelps Dodge organization, but was an “unknown captain of industry”, shunning publicity. His greatest interest was the railroad, and he became the largest private owner of railroad stock in the United States.

He believed in the future of California and gained controlling interest in the Western Pacific line, Great Northern, Northern Pacific, Burlington, Southern Pacific, and other Western railroads. He had a dominant position in the control of 40,000 miles of track - about one-seventh of entire network in the United States. Before the Great Depression, he was one of the wealthiest men in America.

In 1924, he was admitted to the Connecticut Society of the Cincinnati by virtue of his descent from Lieutenant Thomas Phelps, who had served in the Continental Army during the American Revolution.

The children of James's grandfather from his second marriage remained in England and took no interest in running the Phelps Dodge business. James remained on social terms with them and during a visit to England in 1909, he met King Edward VII at a house party given by James's half-uncle, William Dodge James.

== Residences ==
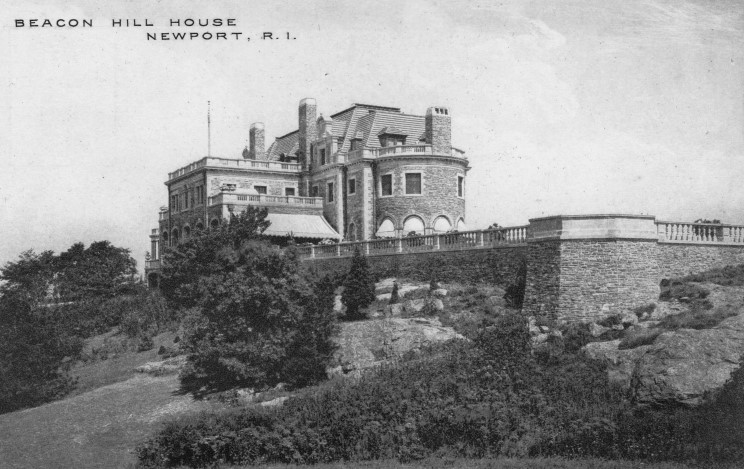
Beacon Hill House Newport RI 1917

His Newport, Rhode Island, summer residence was named Beacon Hill House. In addition to the house and gardens, James also built a replica Swiss village on his Newport estate which served as a working farm. The Swiss village was said to have been built as a replica of a village James and his wife visited on their honeymoon in Switzerland. The architects involved with the building of Beacon Hill House for James were Howells & Stokes. Stokes was Isaac Newton Phelps Stokes, son of James's cousin, Anson Phelps Stokes.

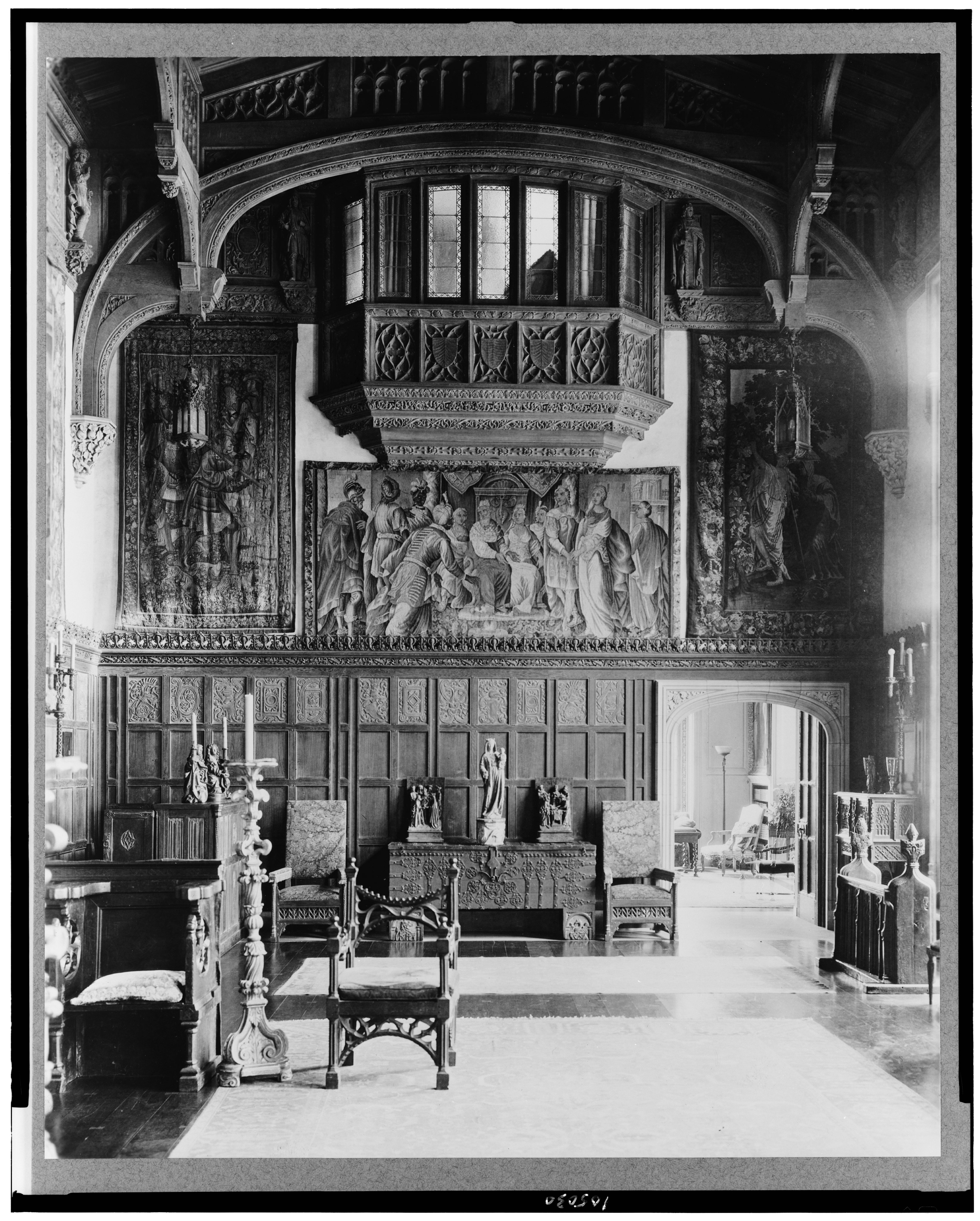
Interior of the home of Arthur Curtiss James, 39 East 69th Street, New York City

Beacon Hill House fell into disuse and disrepair after James' death in 1941. It was torn down in the 1960s.

The gardens of Beacon Hill House, as of early 2013, were in the process of restoration due to the patronage of Mrs. Dorrance Hill Hamilton. The Swiss village is now the home of the SVF Foundation, also a project of Mrs. Hamilton, which seeks to preserve rare breeds of livestock.

He had his mansion, the Arthur Curtiss James House, constructed on 39 East 69th Street in New York City. There was also a "cottage" in Coconut Grove, Miami, owned by James.

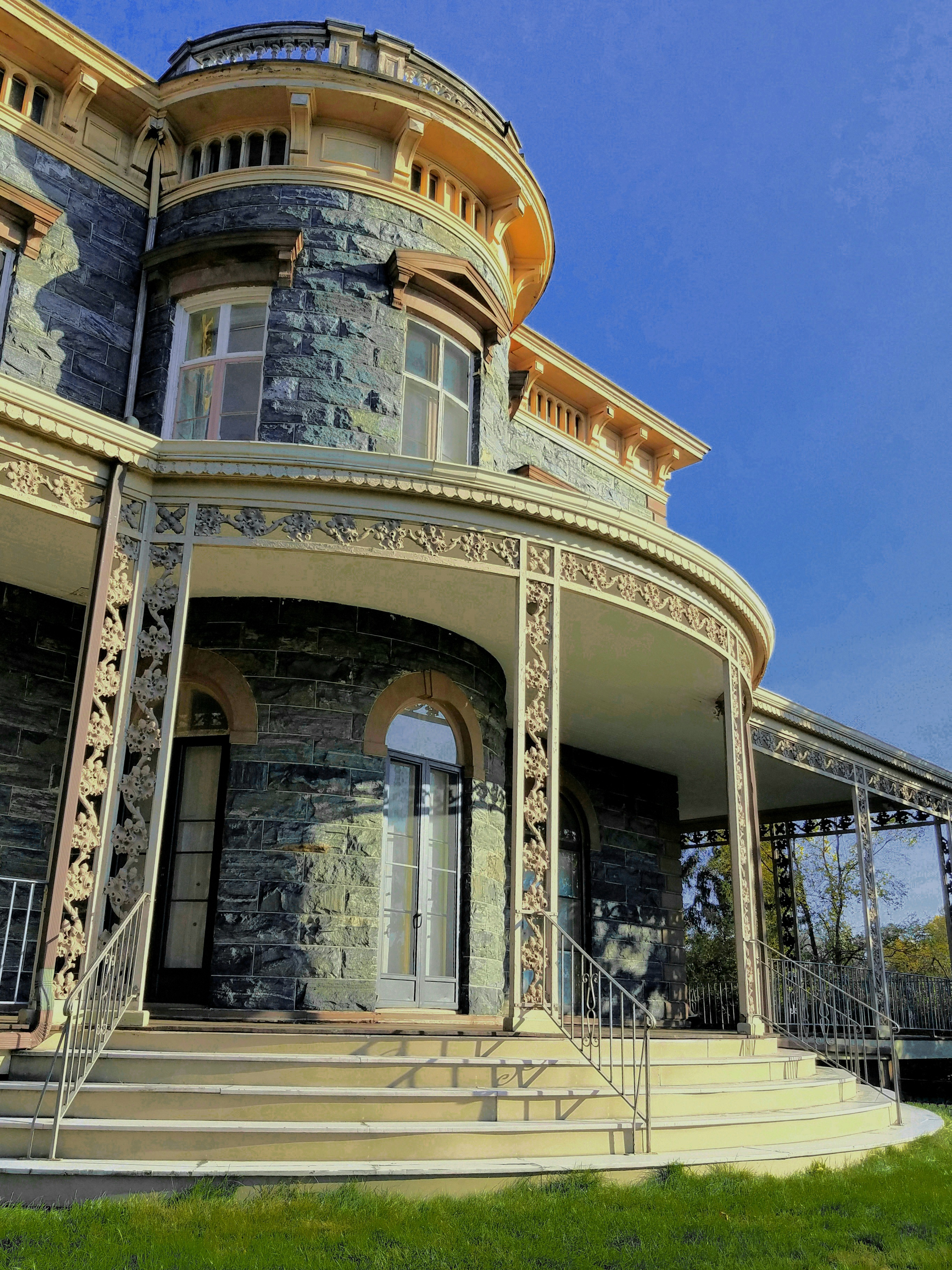
James House Mansion on the campus of Sleepy Hollow’s Phelps Hospital

James also purchased a mansion in Sleepy Hollow, New York that had belonged to his cousin Anson Green Phelps Jr. (1818-1858) and his wife Jane Gibson. After the death of James and his wife, the house stood empty until it was donated to the Phelps Memorial Hospital Association; it is now a convention centre.

== Yachting ==
In 1896, James took Professor David P. Todd and his team, who made up the Amherst Eclipse Expedition, to Japan in his yacht Coronet, considered by many to be the finest sailing yacht of its day, to observe the sun's total obscuration. Funding was provided by James's father.

James was an avid yachtsman. He served as commodore of the New York Yacht Club from 1909 to 1910 and was the first commodore of the Ida Lewis Yacht Club in Newport from 1928 to 1932.

=== Aloha ===
James' most prized possession was his barque-rigged 218-foot, 659-ton, sail and steam yacht Aloha. This Aloha, the second of that name for James, was one of the largest yachts of its day and large sailing yachts were unusual at that time, as steam had become the preferred means of propulsion.

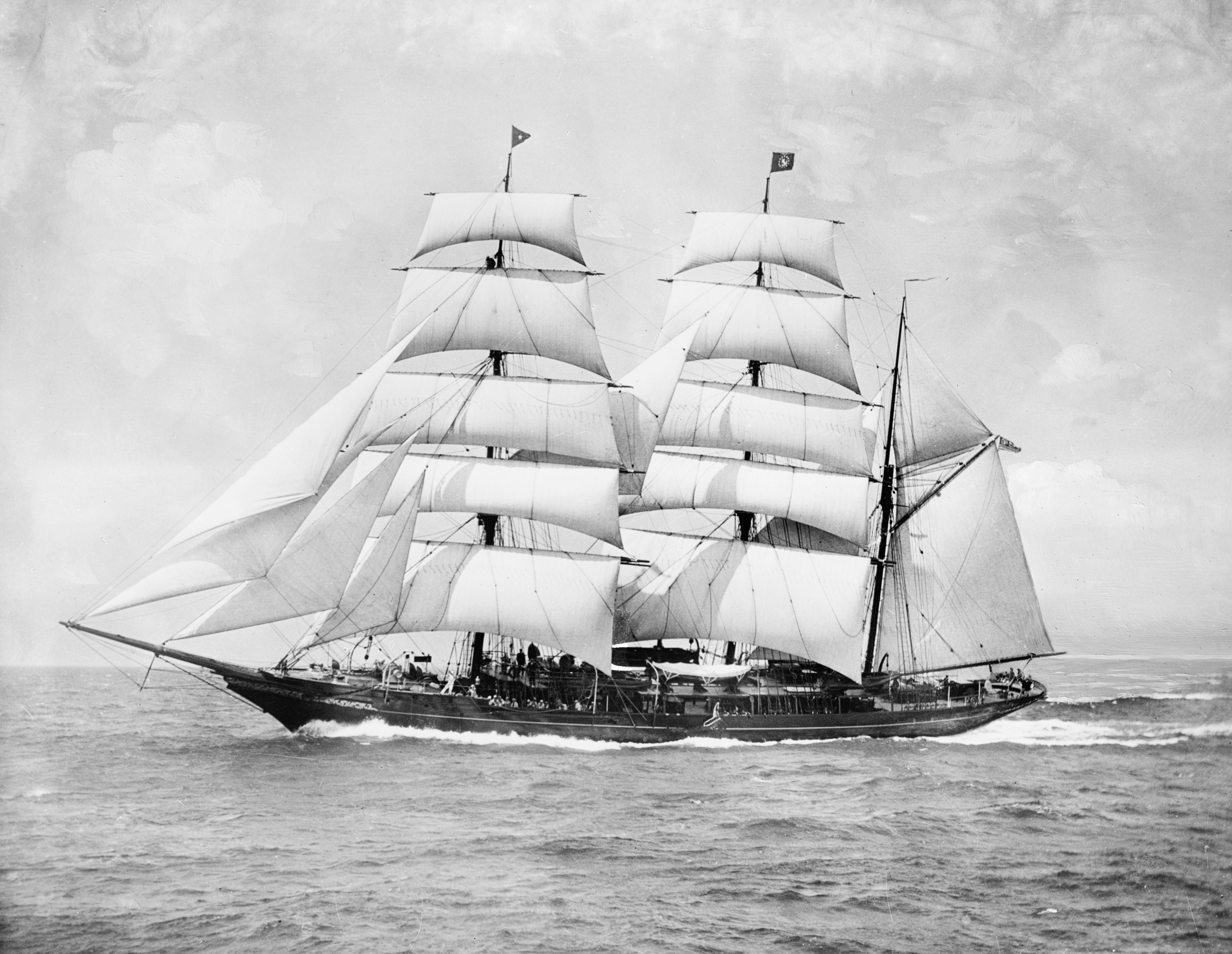
Yacht Aloha

Aloha was built in 1910 at the Fore River Shipyard in Quincy, Massachusetts, designed by James long-time friend and master mariner Peleoman Bezanson and was acquired by the U.S. Navy during the First World War. Commissioned as USS Aloha in 1917, she served as the flagship for the inspector of Naval Districts, East Coast, Rear Admiral Cameron McRae Winslow. After the war ended, the Navy returned Aloha to James in January 1919.

From 1921 to 1922 James took Aloha on an around-the-world tour and used her to visit Europe several times thereafter. James personally supervised the crew in their operation of the yacht, alongside master mariner Peleoman Bezanson who spent a generation as first mate and captain of the two Alohas. Aloha was scrapped in 1938.

As James did not own waterfront property in Newport, he purchased a narrow right-of-way off Harrison Avenue leading to Brenton Cove, where he built a dock and a boathouse for Aloha. The property is named Aloha Landing. Due to the tight confines of the property, James is rumored to have installed a turntable in the boathouse to turn his car around.

== Death ==
James died on June 4, 1941, just weeks after the death of his wife. He left about $38 million, of which over $25 million were put in trust to the James Foundation, for use in charitable, religious, and education institutions. The terms were such that the money had to be distributed within 25 years of his death.
