= Lida Rose McCabe =

American journalist (1865–1938)

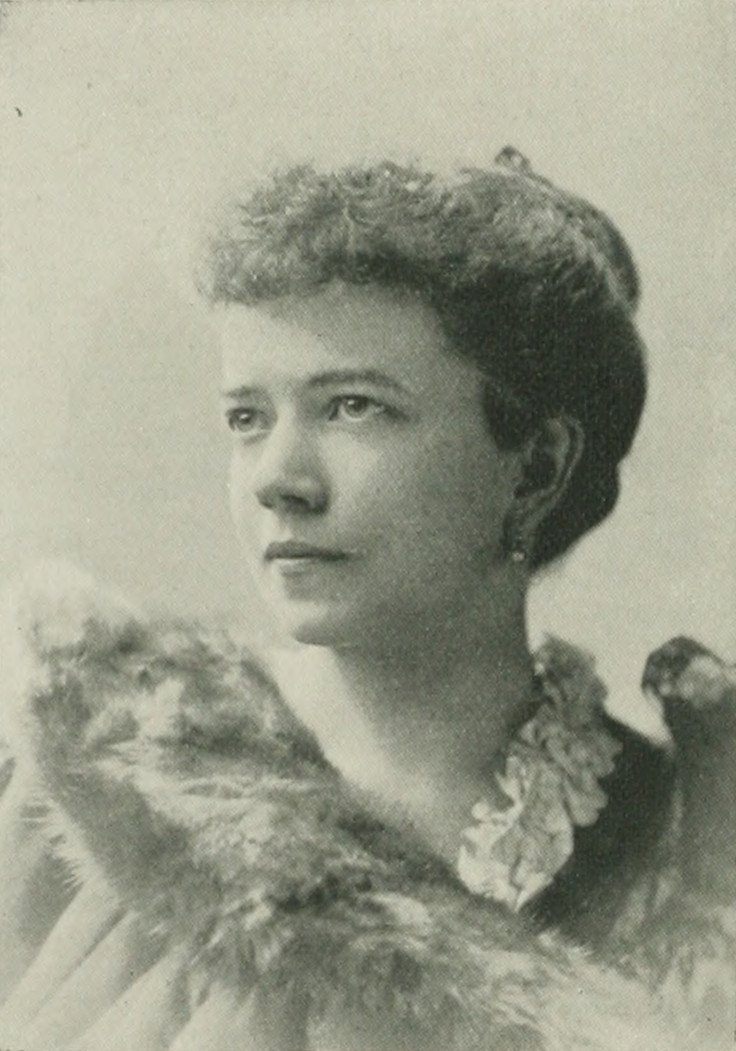
- Photo in A Woman of the Century
- Born: March 3, 1865; Columbus, Ohio, U.S.
- Died: December 9, 1938 (aged 73); New York City, New York, U.S.
- Education: Columbus High School, Columbus, Ohio, U.S.
- Occupations: author; journalist; correspondent; lecturer
- Writing career
- Language: English
- Subjects: women's education; employment; compensation
- Notable work: The American girl at college (1893)

Lida Rose McCabe (March 3, 1865 – December 9, 1938) was an American writer, journalist, and lecturer. She is remembered as the first woman reporter who traveled to the Klondike. Her first book, Don't You Remember? (1884) was a reminiscence of Columbus, Ohio's early days. In the midst of an active newspaper life in New York City, she found time for the writing of other books, including The American Girl at College (1893) and Ardent Adrienne: The Life of Madame de La Fayette (1930), as well as magazine articles. McCabe contributed to the Popular Science Monthly, Lippincott's Monthly Magazine, McClure's, The Cosmopolitan, St. Nicholas Magazine, Book Buyer, The Outlook, The Bookman, and Town & Country, and syndicated all leading newspaper in the U.S. and abroad. She was also Paris correspondent for the New-York Tribune and the American Press Association (1889–90).

== Early life and education ==
Lida Rose McCabe was born in Columbus, Ohio, March 3, 1865. Her parents were Irish.

She studied at Columbus High School in her native city, participating in the school choir where, on occasion, she sang obbligato, and this was followed by studies at Convent Notre Dame de Sion, Paris. In addition, she attended lectures at the Sorbonne, Paris; Columbia University, New York; and Oxford University Extension Course.

== Career ==
=== Writer ===
She showed an early inclination for literary work, and at eighteen years of age, she was a contributor to the Cincinnati Commercial-Gazette. Since then, she was active in newspaper and magazine work and more ambitious ventures in book publishing. A volume of historic sketches, with the title Don't You Remember?, which dealt with early events in her home town, Columbus, and the Scioto Valley, Ohio, was successful. When her "Social and Literary Recollections of W. D. Howells" appeared in Lippincott's Monthly Magazine, the reviewer referred to the writer as "Mr. L. R. McCabe," her initials only being given. For some time, those initials covered her identity from those who failed to detect "only a woman" in her writing style.

In 1889, in the Paris Exposition Universelle, she did her first work for the American Press Association, and her letters were favorably received from the start. Her first intention was to spend a few months abroad and then return to her home, to engage in literary work. A love of Paris and its wonderful possibilities, and a desire to become familiar with the French language, kept her there for more than a year. During her visit to France, she went over the scenes of General Lafayette's life, sleeping two nights in the room where he was born at Château de Chavaniac in Auvergne. McCabe also traveled 7,000 miles (11,000 km) into Alaska, spending four months in Nome and skirting the Siberian coast.

She wrote for several Ohio papers starting when she was thirteen years old. Her later work, with widening circles of readers, was through the American Press Association, McClure's Syndicate, Harper's publications, St. Nicholas Magazine, Frank Leslie's Illustrated Newspaper, Popular Science Monthly, Lippincott's Monthly Magazine, The Cosmopolitan, and The Christian Union. She was a contributor to Chicago, Washington, D.C., and New York papers, and after making her home in New York, she wrote for the New-York Tribune, New York Herald, New York World, and Commercial Advertiser.

She wrote various books, among which was Don't You Remember? Historical Sketches of Ohio and Occupations and Compensations of Women (Tribune Pub. Co., N.Y.). (Note: A notice in The Writer (November 1898) mentions: "The New York Tribune offers a prize of $50 for the best design for the cover of its forthcoming publication, "Occupations of Women and Their Compensation". Further information may be had from Miss Lida R. McCabe, No. 64 Fifth avenue, New York." Occupations of women and their compensation; a compilation of essays by prominent authorities on all the leading trades and professions in America in which women have asserted their ability, with data as to the compensation afforded in each one. was published by The New York Tribune, in 1898, without mention of McCabe's role as the editor. The book's Preface states in part that the majority of these articles were printed in the Tribune of October 2, 1898.)

The American Girl at College, a series of papers that originally appeared in a newspaper, gave a wide range of practical, though somewhat discursive information as to the character, work, habits, social life, studies of college life for American women. Book News Monthly (1894) commented, "The tone is a little crude and the standard immature." Ardent Adrienne (1930) was a biography of Madame de La Fayette.

=== Lecturer ===
Well versed in the theory and the execution of art, music and literature, McCabe lectured on travel and art. She opened Ethical Lectures at St. Xavier's College, New York City, to women. She served as regular staff in Public School Lecture Course of New York City. She was the second woman to lecture before the New-York Historical Society, her subject being "Madame de Lafayette, America's Half-Forgotten Friend". In January 1920, she addressed the New York Genealogical and Biographical Society with a lecture on "Madame de Lafayette, America's Half-Forgotten Friend", which address was illustrated by many stereopticon slides. On the occasion of commemorating the first decade of the Watterson Reading Circle, a Catholic reading circle in Columbus, Ohio, McCabe gave a lecture on "The Preaching Friars in Florentine Art".

== Personal life ==
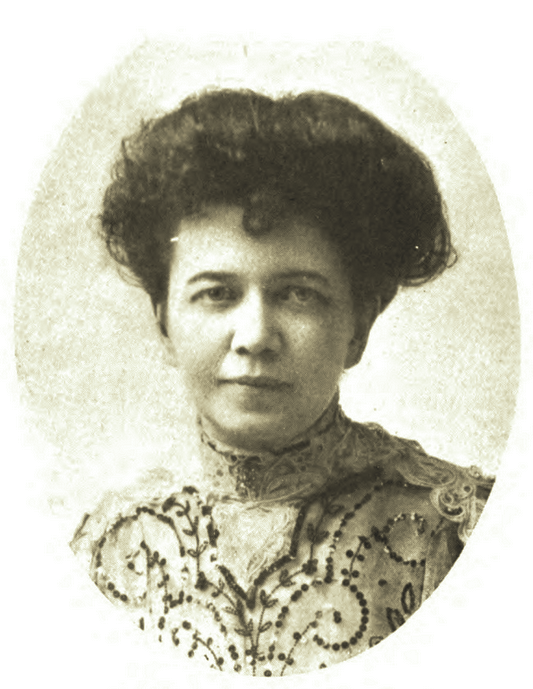
Lida Rose McCabe, 1898

McCabe was a member of the Pen and Brush Club, New York. In religion, she was Catholic. She made her home at Hotel Martha Washington, 29 East 29 Street, Manhattan, New York.

McCabe died December 9, 1938, at the Madison Square Hotel, New York City.

A biography, Lida Rose McCabe: An Early Ohio Journalist, was published by Mary Catherine Foley in 1989.

== Selected works ==
=== Books ===
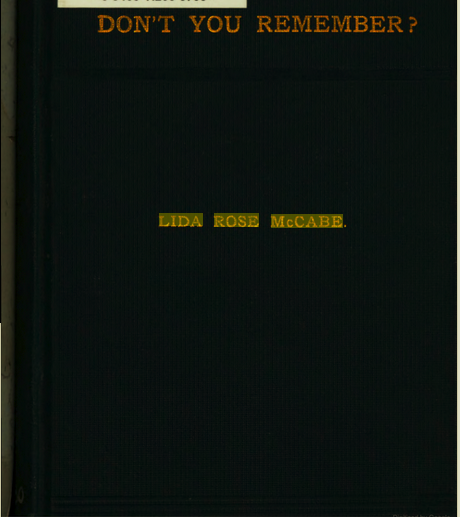
Don't You Remember? (1884)

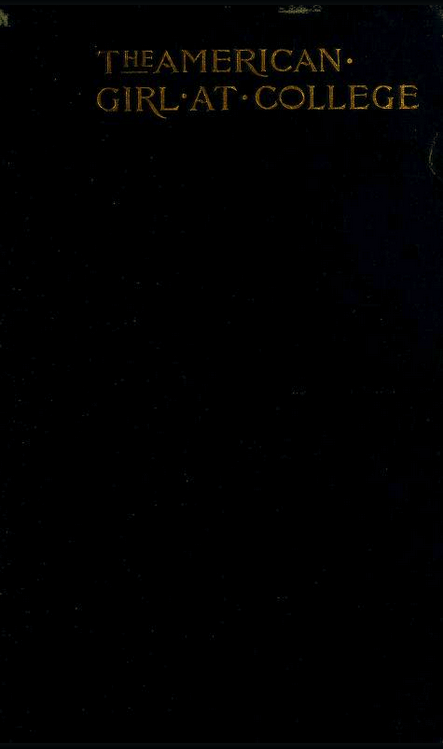
The American girl at college (1893)

- Don't You Remember? Historical Sketches of Ohio (1884)
- Occupations and Compensations of Women
- The American Girl at College (1893)
- Ardent Adrienne: The Life of Madame de La Fayette (1930)

=== Articles ===
- "Historic Circleville in pictures. Volume eight" (with Robert E. Good)
- "Sketch of Leo Lesquereux" (1887)
- "Kate Brownlee Sherwood" (1891)
- "Margaret Sullivan: The Ablest Woman Journalist in the Country" (1893)
- The Indian Man" (1893)
- "Lincoln's Body-Guard: Reminiscences of Lincoln's Last Days in the White House" (1893)
- "Some Representataive Booksellers of Old London" (1893)
- "The Boyhood of Edison" (1893)
- "The Oberlin-Wellington Rescue : an antislavery crisis which almost precipitated the Civil War in 1859 through the secession of the North" (1896)
- "The "Martha Washington" case" (1897)
- "An Invincible Horse-Tamer" (1898)
- "A stage setting" (1900)
- "Barberini Tapestries at the Cathedral of St. John the Divine" (1900)
- "Famous Tapestries in America" (1901)
- "Columbus: The Cradle of America's Kindergarten" (1901)
- "Inlaying and extra illustration" (1902)
- "The First Complete English Edition of the Poems of Leo XIII" (1902)
- "A pilgrimage to Poe's cottage" (1903)
- "At Windygoul with Ernest Thompson Seton" (1903)
- "Literary Life in India" (1903)
- Gentlewomen in Domestic Service" (1904)
- "Poor Girls Who Marry Millions" (1906)
- "Where dog is king" (1908)
- "How America Made Rosa Bonheur and Brought Her Fame, Fortune, and a Friend to Whom She left Her Home" (1911)
- "Lafayette's Chateau, A Visit to Chavaniac, The Ancient Castle in Auvergne Where Lafayette Was Born" (1911)
- "A Maker of Imperishable Songs" (1913)
- "American Miniature in Old World Setting: J. W. Von Relling Quistgaard, Painter in Little" (1913)
- "Branda Putnam, Modeler of Children" (1913)
- "Illustrious Painter of Illustrious Men" (1913)
- "National Academy's Winter Exhibit" (1913)
- "George Bellows, Academician" (1913)
- "Etching of Robert Blum" (1913)
- "Colonial Heirlooms at Van Cortlandt Museum" (1913)
- "A British Interpreter of American Childhood" (1913)
- "Meunier, Labor's Apostle in Sculpture" (1913)
- "Architecture and Its High Priests" (1913)
- "The Morgan Collection and "Muhammadan Art" (1913)
- "Book Preservation" (1914)
- "An American Woman's Triumph, Marguerite Duprez Lahey" (1916)
- "Regenerating Handicrafts in the Carolinas" (1917)
- "Mercié and His American Affiliations" (1917)
- "When Designer and Manufacturer Meet" (1917)
- "Rise of American China Painting" (1917)
- "Luxuriant Art in Leather" (1917)
- "A Story-Telling Bird Bath" (1917)
- "Some Painters Who Happen to Be Women" (1918)
- "Peasant Art in New York's Bohemia" (1918)
- "Camouflage: War's Handmaid" (1918)
- The Marionette Revival" (1920)
- "The Revival of the Mask. The Contribution of Modern Arts and Crafts to the Revitalization of the Stage" (1920)
- "Madame Bouguereau, Pathfinder" (1922)
- "The beginnings of halftone" (1924; with Stephen H. Horgan)
- "Surprise Valley Farm: On the Estate of Arthur Curtiss James, Esq., at Newport, R.I." (1924)
- "La Fayette, Marie Adrienne (de Noailles) marquise de 1759-1807." (1932)

=== Plays ===
- Vanderbilt Cup (2nd act)
