= Williamson College of the Trades =

Private men's vocational college in Middletown Township, Pennsylvania, US

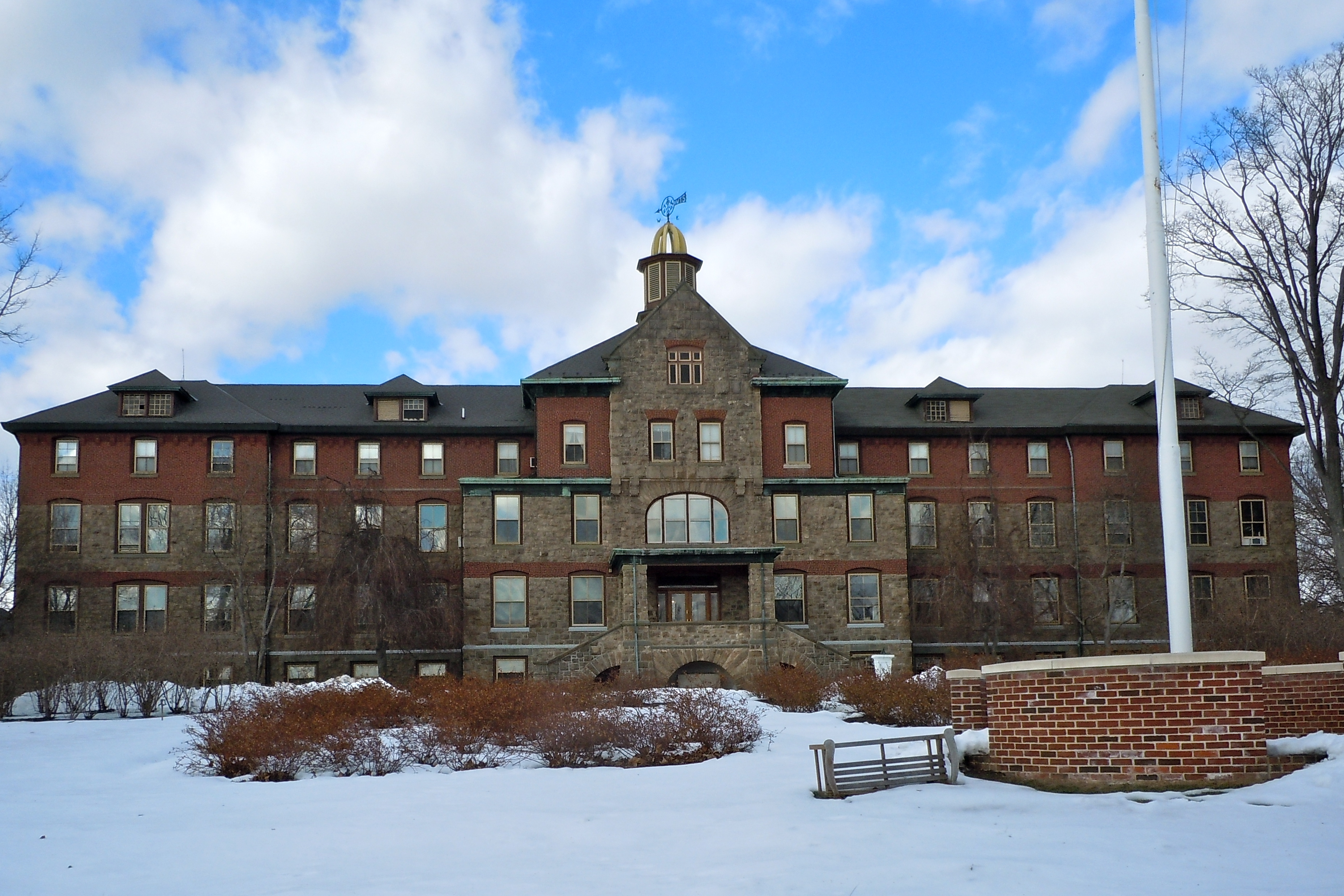
- Type: Private men's junior vocational college
- Established: 1888
- President: Michael J. Rounds
- Undergraduates: 330
- Location: 106 S. New Middletown Road, Media, Pennsylvania, 19063, U.S. 39.9065°N 75.4234°W
- Campus: Rural, 220 acres (89 ha)
- Colors: Blue, gold, white
- Nickname: Mechanics
- Sporting affiliations: USCAA
- Website: www.williamson.edu

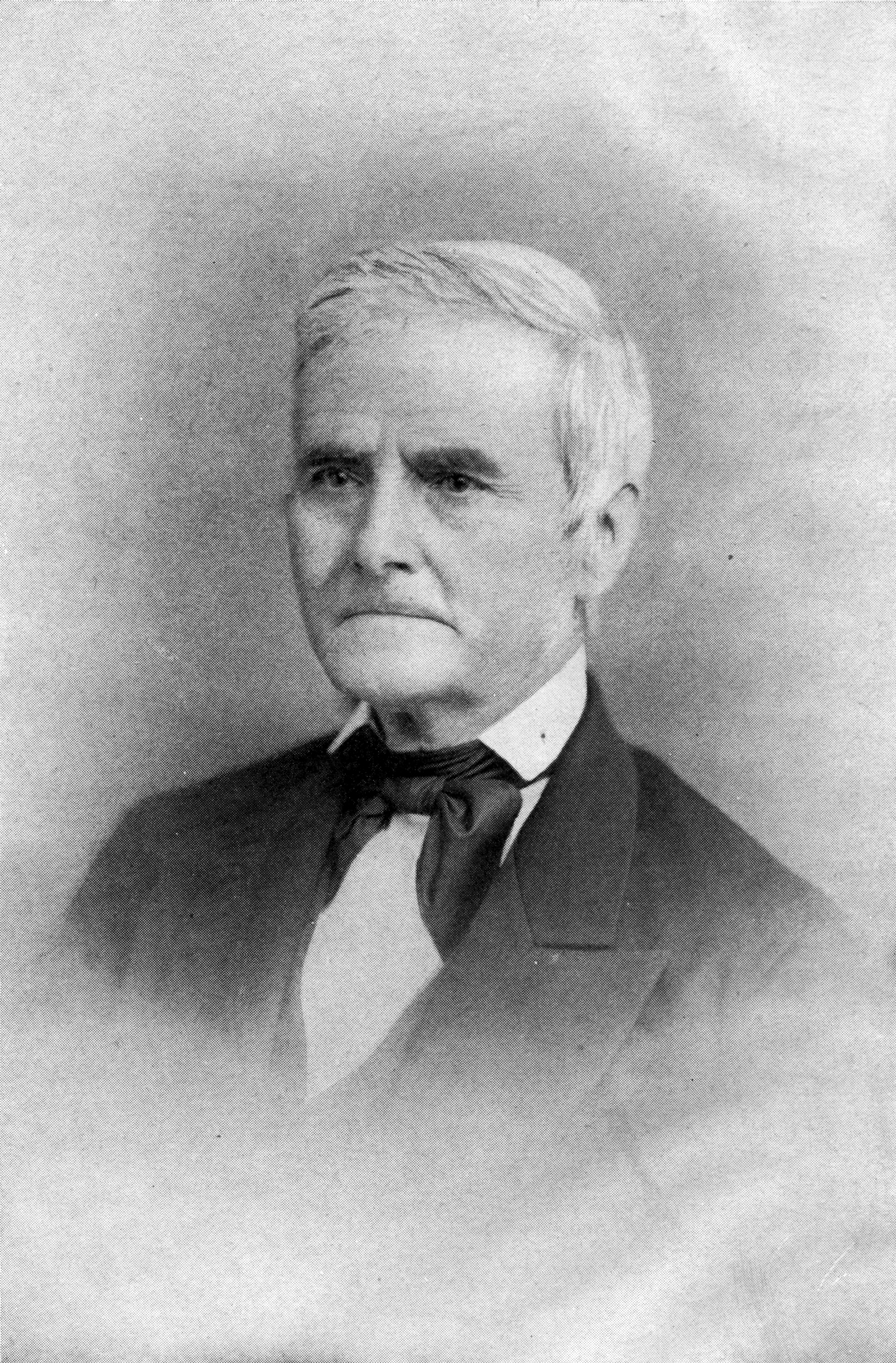
Isaiah Vansant Williamson c.1880

Williamson College of the Trades (formerly Williamson Free School of Mechanical Trades) is a private men's junior vocational college in Media, Pennsylvania. The school was founded on December 1, 1888, by Philadelphia merchant and philanthropist Isaiah Vansant Williamson.

External videos
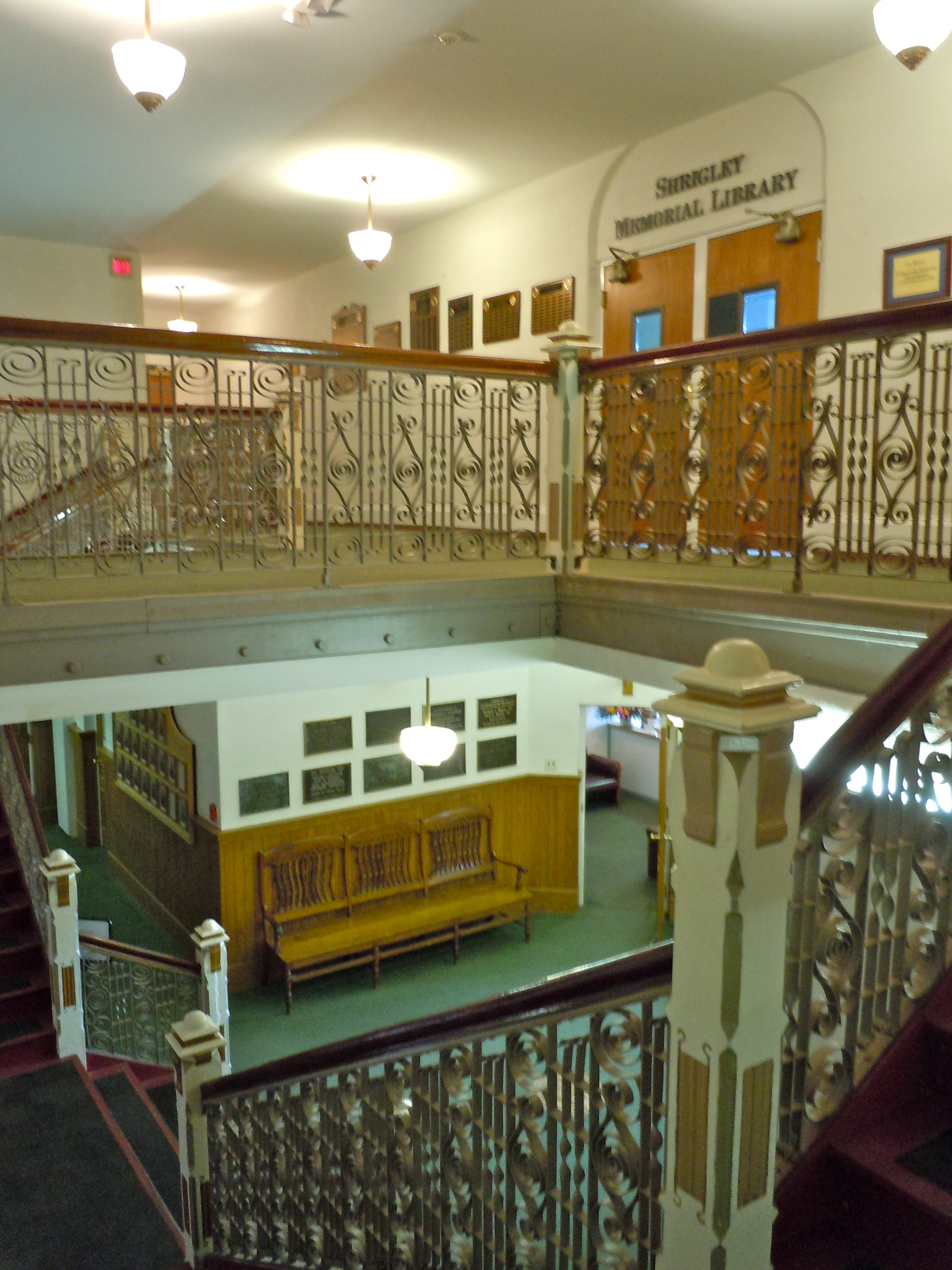
- https://www.youtube.com/watch?v=Bj_2vHwxK-U&t=10s Williamson Comprehensive Trade Education

== History ==
=== Historic dates ===
- December 1, 1888– "Williamson Free School of Mechanical Trades" is founded by philanthropist Isaiah Vansant Williamson
- March 7, 1889– Isaiah Vansant Williamson passes away, the day after he approves the site for the school's campus.
- October 31, 1891– The campus formally opens.
- 1957– After most of the shop buildings are destroyed by fire, four new shop buildings are constructed and named "The John Wanamaker Free School of Artisans" and funded by the Rodman Wanamaker estate.
- 1961– Williamson Free School of Mechanical Trades becomes a post-secondary institution.
- March 2008- Henry and Lee Rowan and H. FitzGerald (Gerry) and Marguerite Lenfest donate $45 million to the school's endowment.
- July 1, 2015– "Williamson Free School of Mechanical Trades" is officially renamed "Williamson College of the Trades"
- June 2021 - Joseph L. and Marion M. Wesley donate $20 million to build the Wesley Student Center.

=== Planning and founding ===
After contemplating the idea since the 1850s, Isaiah Williamson spent the final decade of his life formulating and developing the concept for a new trade school for underprivileged boys to be located in a suburb of Philadelphia. Williamson personally drafted the Foundation of Deed, which he presented to the board of trustees on December 1, 1888. The charter members of the board of trustees were all accomplished in their own right, consisting of mostly tradesmen, who were colleagues and friends of Williamson. The seven charter trustees included: John Baird, James C. Brooks, Lemuel Coffin, Edward Longstreth, William C. Ludwig, Henry C. Townsend, and Williamson's close friend and protege, John Wanamaker. Baird was chosen as president of the trustees (after Wanamaker declined the position), and Brooks and Helmbold were selected as treasurer and secretary, respectively. John M. Shrigley was also appointed secretary and President of the school. He took the lead in developing the campus and implementing the curriculum.

=== Campus ===
On March 6, 1889, the day before he died, Isaiah Williamson approved the purchase of 220 acres of land to be used for the school's campus in Middletown Township, near Elwyn, Pennsylvania. The site was selected from over 200 prospective locations, and the trustees acted quickly to secure the property and carry out Williamson's vision for the institution. The campus was later described by John Wanamaker as "... gently rolling country with its springs and water courses, its broad pastures, its woodland acres of old oaks and chestnuts, its distant views of fertile farms, thriving towns—natural beauties enhanced by wise and not overdone landscape gardening, winding macadamized drives, and an artistic as well as convenient grouping of the various school buildings".

Renowned Philadelphia architect Frank Furness won the design competition for the original campus buildings. His design was selected from among the other invited submissions for its understated details and simplicity. Ground was broken for the administration building in 1890 and the campus opened for classes in September, 1891. The original campus buildings consisted of: the Administration Building, the boiler house, a shop building, the Superintendent's residence and 3 cottages.

Most of the original buildings are still functioning as they were originally purposed. Over the decades, Williamson has maintained a rustic feel to its campus by keeping the majority of its land undeveloped.

The current facilities on the campus include:

==== Rowan Hall ====
Administrative offices, student lounge, dining room, and the chapel (originally "Main Building", renamed on November 15, 2016).

==== The John Wanamaker Free School of Artisans ====
An integral part of the college, includes separate, modern carpentry, machine, paint, and masonry shops.

==== Walter M. Strine, Sr. 2W9 Learning Center ====
Houses the library, the placement office, faculty and administrative offices, and classrooms.

==== Lipp Educational Center ====
Includes classrooms, faculty offices, a computer laboratory, a resource room with a technical library, and three separate laboratories.

==== Dorrance H. Hamilton Horticultural Center ====
The complex of facilities supporting the Landscape Construction and Management program is named after the philanthropist Mrs. Dorrance Hill Hamilton.

==== William L. McLean, Jr. Technical Center ====
Technical center named in honor of newspaper executive, William L. McLean Jr.

==== The Restall Sports Center ====
Completed in 1988, includes a basketball court, indoor running track, weight room, locker rooms, offices, lounge, and laundry facilities.

==== Student housing ====
14 dormitories, including Byers Hall II & III, C Cottage, Clemens, Derrickson, Eyre, George, Jenks, Longstreth, Smith, Townsend, Watson (2017), Strine (2022) and Howley (2024)

==== Faculty homes ====
On-campus housing for faculty members.

==== Athletic fields ====
Baseball, football, lacrosse, and soccer fields. Also, tennis courts.

==== The Joseph L. and Marion M. Wesley Student Center ====
Opened in January 2023, includes weight and cardio rooms, multi-purpose athletic courts, an esports room, and numerous meeting rooms.

==== Alumni Hall ====
Houses the Clarence W. Schrenk Program in Landscaping Construction and Management, which maintains two greenhouses and many gardens, including the Sabia Garden adjacent to the McLean Technical Center.

=== Pennsylvania historical marker ===
In 2013, a historical marker from the Pennsylvania Historical and Museum Commission was placed near the campus's main entrance in commemoration of the school's 125th anniversary and its noteworthy architecture. The historical marker (#HM1D5B) reads:

Founded in 1888 by philanthropist Isaiah V. Williamson to teach underprivileged young men "some trade, free of expense" via a character-based curriculum. With trade apprenticeships disappearing in the US in the late 19th century, it was a model in vocational education. It is the only trade school in the nation providing full scholarships to all students. The campus contains the largest existing collection of buildings designed by Frank Furness.

== Student life ==
Although the vocational school subscribes to a Christian belief system and enforces a highly disciplined lifestyle, it is not affiliated with any religious organization.

Williamson is the only trade college in the United States that gives all students full scholarships covering tuition and room and board. The college uses its endowment to cover two-thirds of student costs each year, with the balance coming from private donations and fundraising. Williamson College of the Trades is accredited by the Middle States Commission on Higher Education.

All students are required to live on-campus throughout their three years of study. Students live in supervised dormitories, attend a daily chapel service, and follow a dress code. Students must also participate in at least one official student activity each year. Choices include team sports and clubs, such as student newspaper, archery, chess, and student government.

Courses are offered in the following trades:

- Carpentry
- Machine Tool Technology
- Power Plant Technology
- Masonry
- Landscaping Construction and Management
- Electrical

Graduates earn an associate degree in specialized technology in their chosen field.
