= Albert Krause =

American sculptor and painter

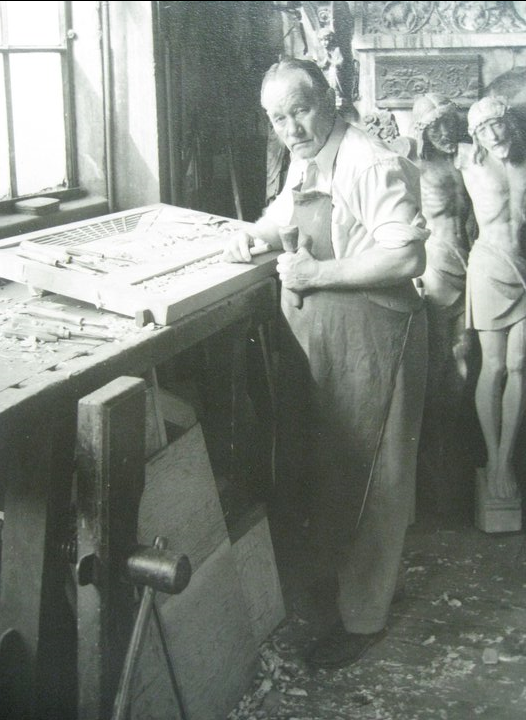
Albert Krause in his workshop

Albert H. Krause (June 27, 1882 in Philadelphia, Pennsylvania – October 31, 1961 in Philadelphia, Pennsylvania) was an American wood sculptor and painter.

== Early years ==
Krause lived on the 2100 block of Reed Street. As a child he watched his father (William Oscar Krause) work with wood. Later he would apprentice under his father and learn how to draw and paint. Ultimately, he would learn how to carve and sculpt wood.

He opened a shop at 500 North Franklin Street in Philadelphia, where he would carve statues for local sites.

== Noted paintings ==
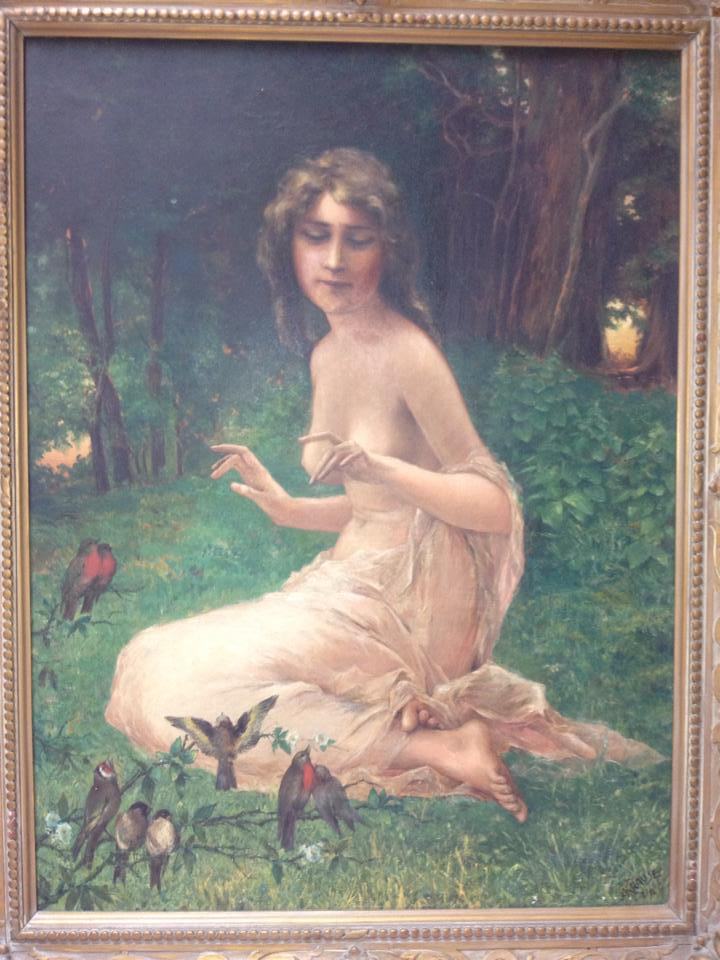
Painting of Girl with Bird in Forest (1914)

- Girl with Bird in Forest – oil on canvas (1914)
- Man Walking Cattle – oil on canvas (unknown date)
- Unknown Lady – oil on canvas (unknown date)
- Sheep Herder with Sheep – oil on canvas (unknown date)
- Farmer with Hoe – oil on canvas (unknown date)
- Lady Greeting Man At Door – oil on canvas (1911)
- Mother Feeding Baby – oil on canvas (unknown date)
- Unfinished Horse – oil on canvas (unknown date)
- Sun Dial – water color (unknown date)
- Lady Holding Book – water color (unknown date)
- Two Men and a Lady – water color (1908)
- Girl Flying Bird on String – oil on wood (unknown date)
- Man Playing Lute – oil on wood (unknown date)

== Known carvings ==
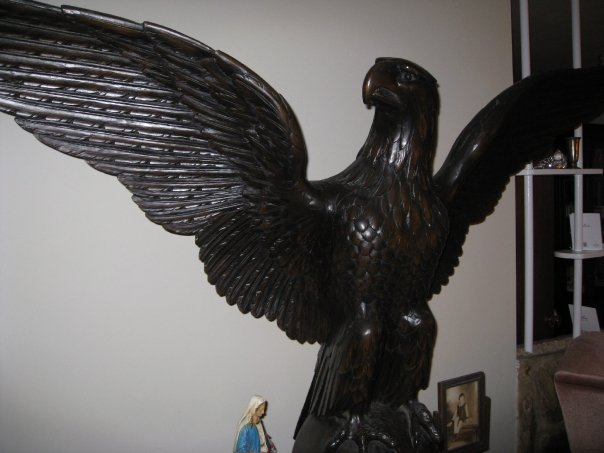
Carving of an Eagle by sculptor Albert Krause for John Wanamaker's department store in Jenkintown.

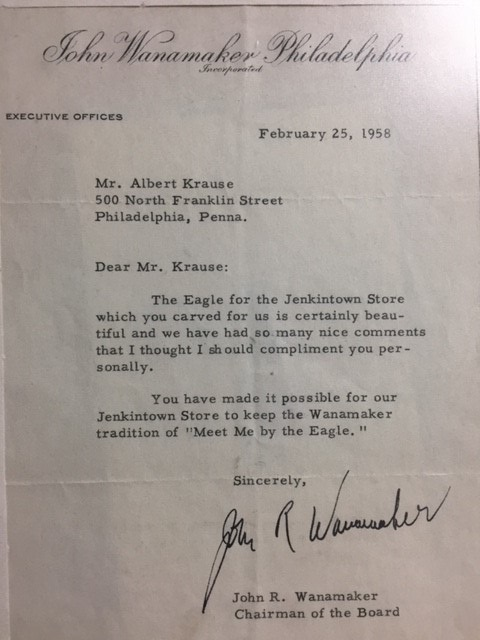
John Wanamaker thank you letter to Albert Krause.

Krause carved the eagle for John Wanamaker's department store in Jenkintown. He also did some carvings for St. Charles Borromeo Catholic Church at Drexel Hill.

== Personal life ==
Albert was married to Rose Herman on April 9, 1919. They lived on 120 S. 59th Street in Philadelphia, Pennsylvania. Their house was completely furnished by furniture and works of art carved by Albert. This included various paintings. Rose died in 1958.
