= Philadelphia Pier 34 collapse =

2000 structural failure

Coordinates: 39.93823°N 75.14034°W

The Philadelphia Pier 34 collapse occurred on May 18, 2000 and caused the death of three women inside Club Heat (located on the end of the Pier) and injuries to dozens of people, as the 91-year-old structure fell into the Delaware River.

The managers of the property were later criminally charged for failure to maintain and repair its foundation, even after several warning signs had appeared in the weeks before the collapse. Pier 34 and Club Heat's owner, socialite Dorrance Hill Hamilton, did not face criminal charges, but paid the legal defense fees of the managers.

== Location and history ==
Pier 34 South Wharves was located on the Philadelphia bank of the Delaware River, just south of Penn's Landing. It was originally built in 1909, on piles with a concrete substructure supporting concrete retaining walls with solid fill and wood-block paving, designed to carry loads of up to 500 pounds per square foot. Similar methods of construction were used for other piers on the Philadelphia waterfront The pier was originally used by steamship lines for loading and unloading freight. In 1932 and 1947, it was owned by the Reading Railroad. In 1932, in addition to ships of the Ward Line, which shipped general freight to and from Cuba and Mexico, the pier was open to any shipper for a fee.

By 1975, the pier was owned and operated by the Independent Pier Company. By 1992, the pier was the site of Eli's Pier 34, which in September of that year was the venue for a boxing match between Bernard Hopkins and Eric Rhinehart.

The nightclub Club Heat opened just a week before the disaster, on the section of the pier farthest from shore.

== Emergency response ==
The collapse occurred around 8 PM while the nightclub was occupied, as a section of the pier (already showing signs of shifting), fell into the cold spring waters of the Delaware River. Strong river currents, lack of light, and a large amount of debris combined with additional threats of collapse from the sections of pier still standing hampered rescue efforts.

The three women who died - Jean Marie Ferraro, 27, of Cherry Hill, New Jersey, Monica Kristina Rodriguez, 21, also of Cherry Hill, New Jersey, and DeAnn White, 25, of Philadelphia - were coworkers at the Camden Aquarium out celebrating White's birthday.

== Criminal charges ==
Based on evidence that showed both men were aware that the pier was in danger of collapse and did little to prevent it, the owner of Pier 34, Michael Asbell, and the Manager of Club Heat, Eli Karetny, were charged by the Philadelphia District Attorneys Office with third-degree murder and other charges, but during deliberations, the jury was unable to come to a unanimous decision.

Fearing facing another trial, they both pleaded guilty. They were sentenced to over 9 months of house arrest and 1,000 hours of community service.

== See also ==
- List of structural failures and collapses
