= Mary Brown Wanamaker =

American social and political leader

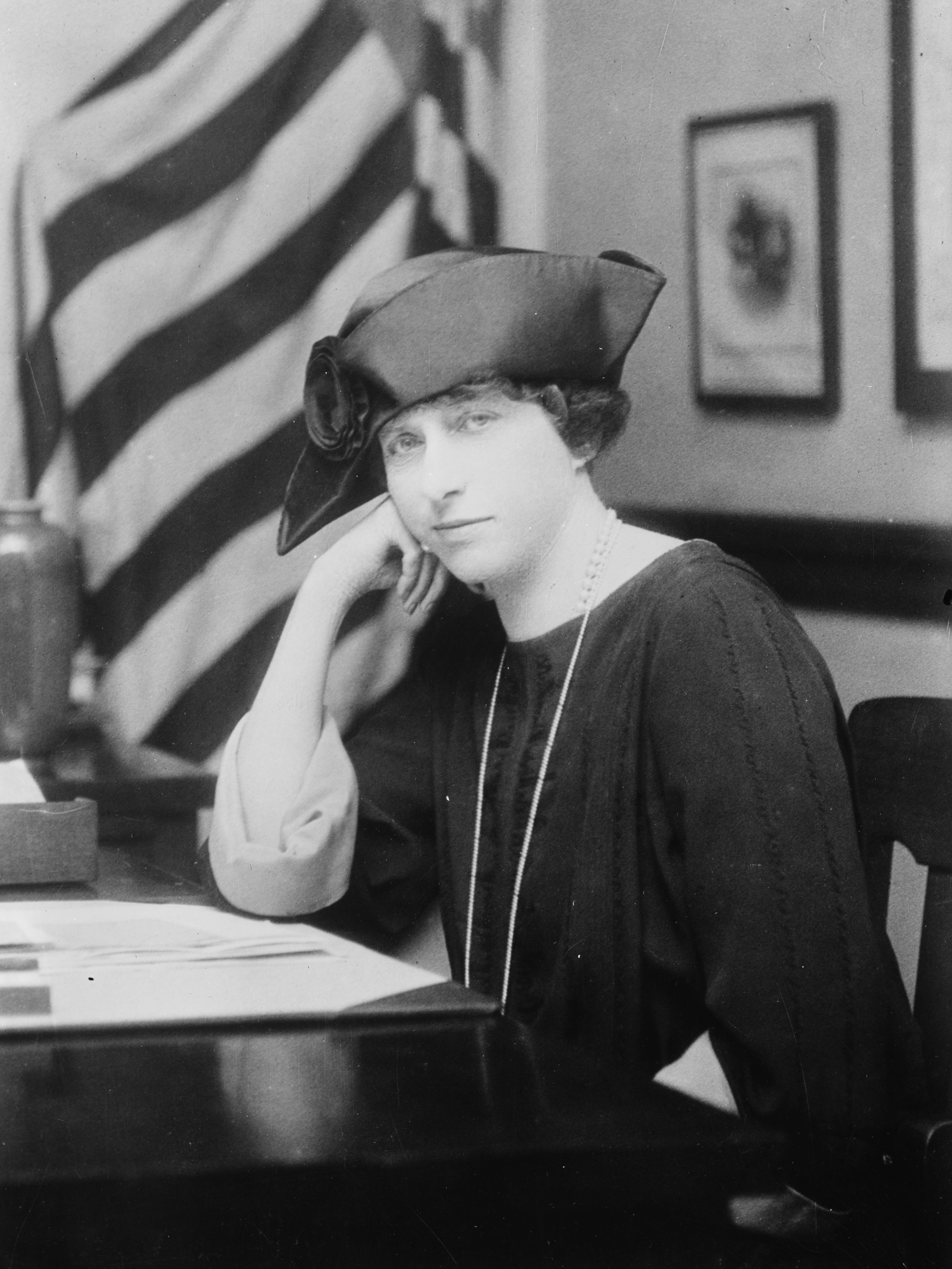
Wanamaker, c. 1922

Mary Brown Wanamaker Warburton (1869 – November 18, 1954) was an American social and political leader. She was the first woman to head the Pennsylvania Republican Committee. She was a daughter of U.S. Postmaster General John Wanamaker and wife of publisher Barclay Harding Warburton I.

Wanamaker was noted for her civil rights activity and southern newspapers wrote scandalously about her when, in 1905, Booker T. Washington was invited to dine with her family at a hotel and he escorted her to the table, arm-in-arm.
