= John Wanamaker =

US Postmaster General and merchant (1838–1922)

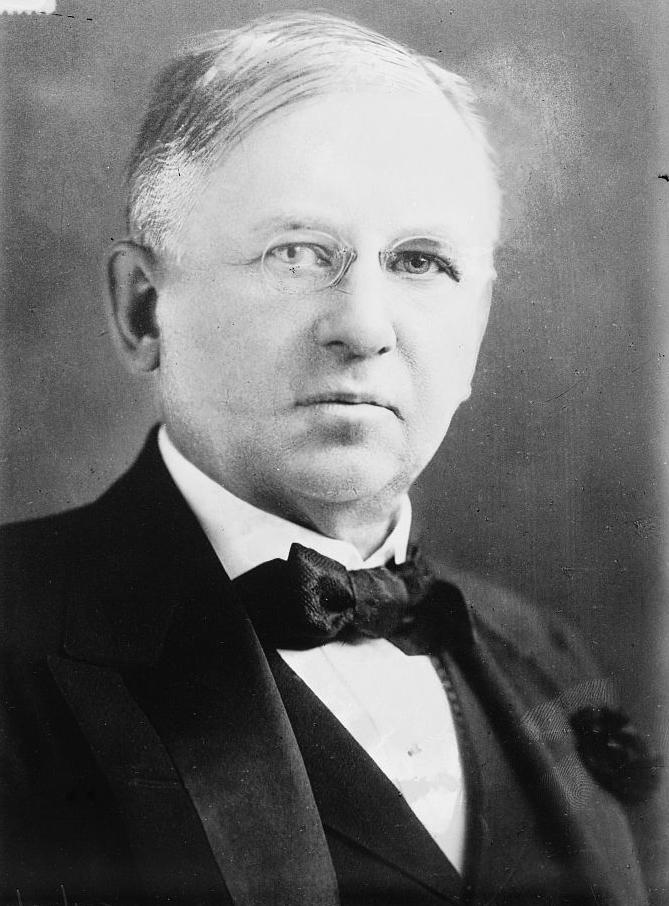
- Wanamaker in July 1915

35th United States Postmaster General
- In office March 5, 1889 – March 4, 1893
- President: Benjamin Harrison
- Preceded by: Donald M. Dickinson
- Succeeded by: Wilson S. Bissell

Personal details
- Born: July 11, 1838 Grays Ferry, Philadelphia, Pennsylvania, U.S.
- Died: December 12, 1922 (aged 84) Philadelphia, Pennsylvania, U.S.
- Resting place: Church of St. James the Less in Philadelphia
- Party: Republican
- Spouse: Mary Erringer Brown
- Children: 6, including Rodman and Minnie
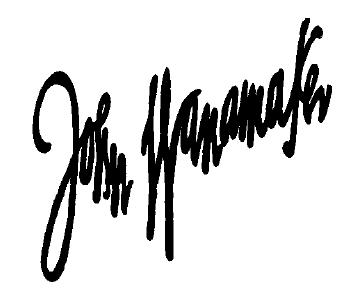
- Signature

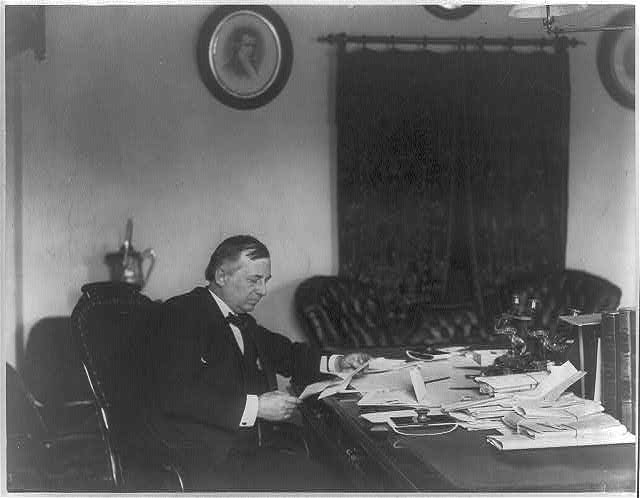
Wanamaker, c.1890

John Wanamaker (July 11, 1838 – December 12, 1922) was an American merchant and religious, civic and political figure, considered by some to be a proponent of advertising and a "pioneer in marketing". He served as United States Postmaster General in the Benjamin Harrison administration from 1889 to 1893.

== Early life and education ==
Wanamaker was born in the Grays Ferry section of South Philadelphia on July 11, 1838. to John Nelson Wanamaker, a brickmaker and native of Kingwood, New Jersey, and Elizabeth Deshong Kochersperger, daughter of a farmer and innkeeper in Gray's Ferry.

His mother's ancestors came from Rittershoffen in Alsace, France, and from Canton of Bern in Switzerland.

== Career ==
At the age of 19, Wanamaker was hired by the Philadelphia YMCA, and served as the first corresponding secretary in the YMCA national organization.

=== Department store business ===
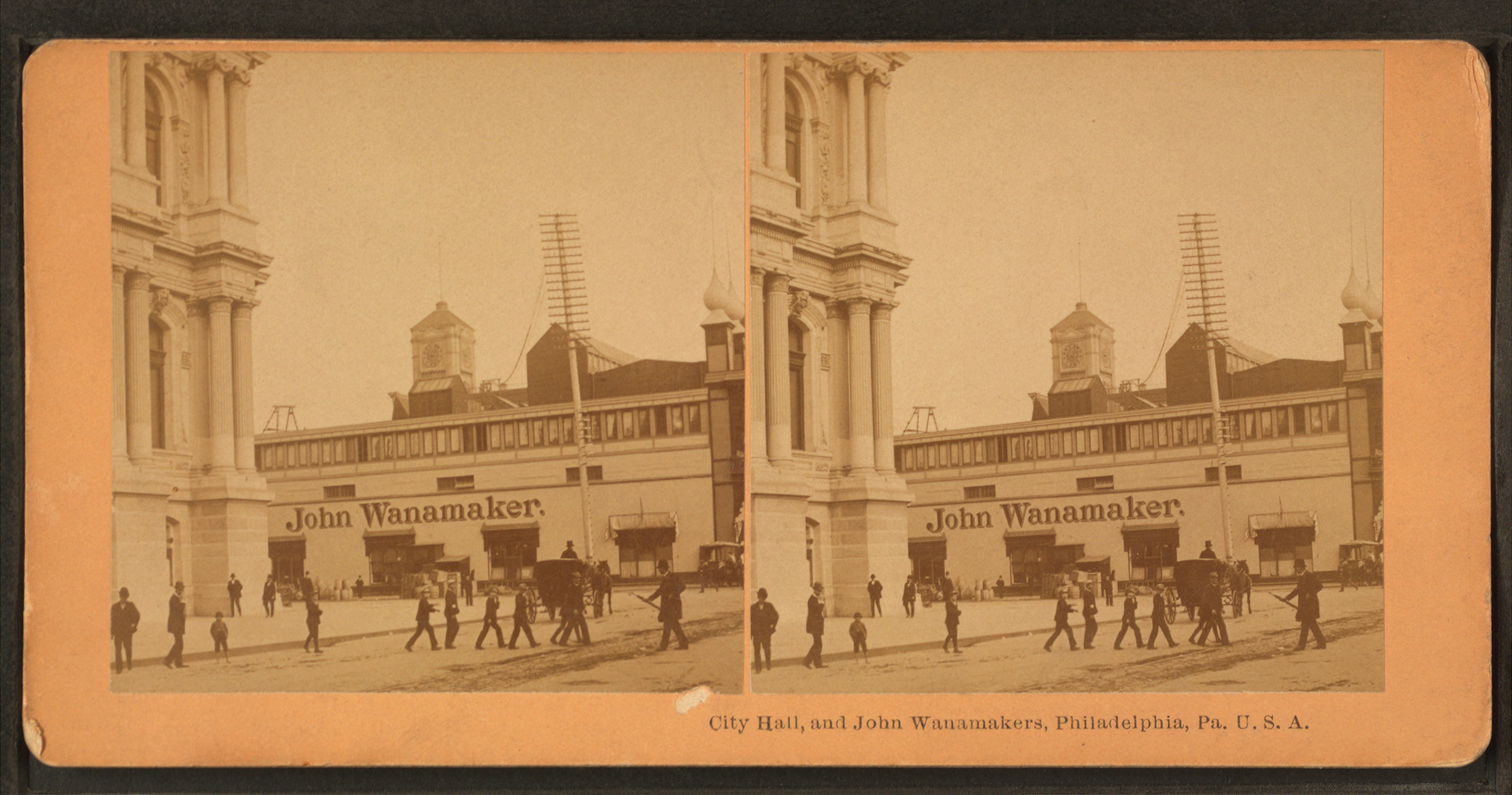
An illustration of Philadelphia City Hall and John Wanamaker's "Grand Depot" at 13th and Market Streets in Philadelphia

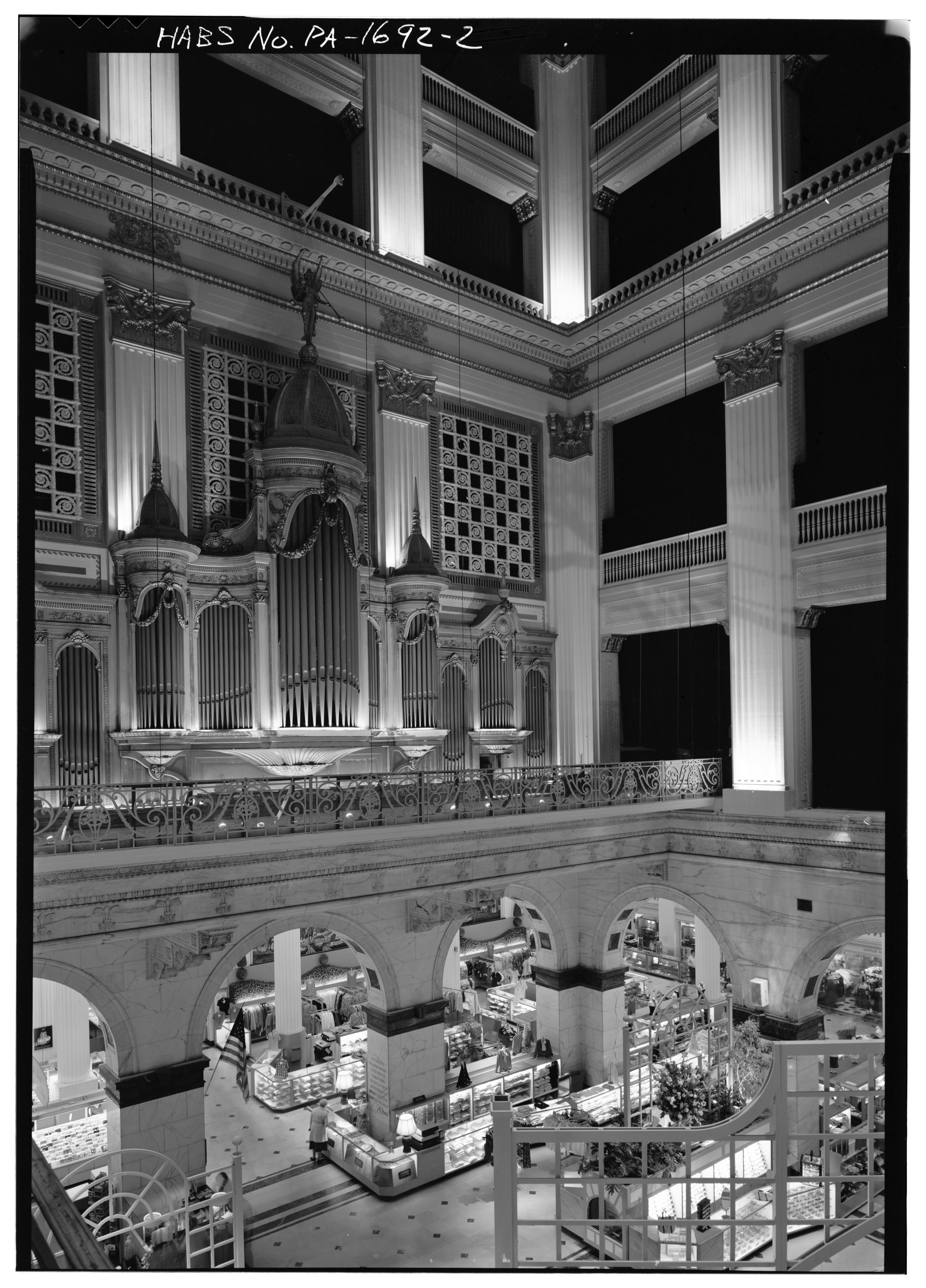
The Grand Court at 13th and Market Streets in Philadelphia

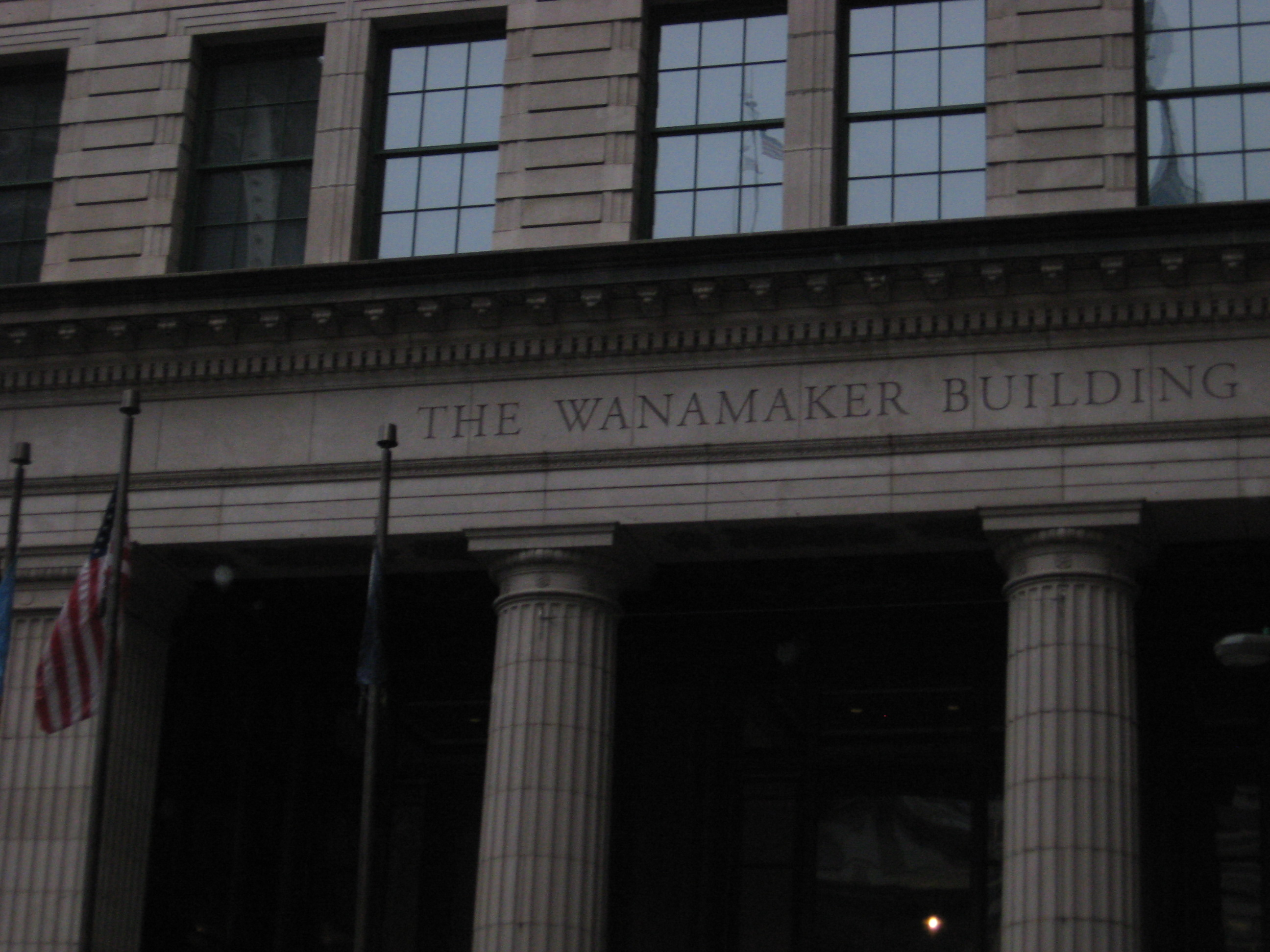
The Wanamaker building at 13th and Market Streets in November 2013

In 1861, Wanamaker opened his first store in partnership with his brother in-law Nathan Brown. The store, called "Oak Hall", was located at 6th and Market Streets in Philadelphia, adjacent to the site of the residence and offices of George Washington during his presidency.

Oak Hall grew substantially based on Wanamaker's then-revolutionary principle: "One price and goods returnable".

In 1869, he opened his second store at 818 Chestnut Street, and, capitalizing on his own name due to the untimely death of his brother-in-law and growing reputation, renamed the company John Wanamaker & Co. In 1875, he purchased an abandoned railroad depot and converted it into a large store, called John Wanamaker & Co. "The Grand Depot". Wanamaker's is considered the first department store in Philadelphia.

==== Wanamaker Building ====
The Wanamaker Building is a large, 12-story granite store in Philadelphia, designed by Chicago architect Daniel H. Burnham and completed in 1910. It was dedicated by U.S. President William Howard Taft on December 30, 1911. The store stands on the site of "The Grand Depot", encompassing an entire block at the corner of 13th and Market Streets across from Philadelphia City Hall. The new store, The Wanamaker Building, which still stands today, became a Philadelphia institution. The entire building was initially devoted to the department store and company offices.

The building has remained an integral part of Philadelphia culture. In 2018, the upper office tower was marketed as the Wanamaker Office Building.

==== Grand Court ====
The Wanamaker Building's most notable feature is its seven-story, marble-clad central atrium, known as the "Grand Court". The Grand Court quickly became a Philadelphia favorite, highlighted by the Wanamaker Eagle and the Wanamaker Grand Court Organ.

The Grand Court has been featured in several movies, including Nasty Habits in 1977, Blow Out in 1981, Mannequin in 1987, and 12 Monkeys in 1995.

==== Wanamaker Organ ====
The Wanamaker Grand Court Organ was designed by George Ashdown Audsley and built by the Los Angeles Art Organ Company for the 1904 St. Louis World's Fair. The instrument had 10,059 pipes, and cost $105,000 to construct, equal to $3,760,000 today. Wanamaker bought the organ in 1909 and had it transported from St. Louis aboard 13 freight cars. The organ's installation in Philadelphia took two years. It was played for the first time on June 22, 1911, to coincide with England's King George V's coronation.

More than 8,000 pipes were added to the organ between 1911 and 1917. By 1930, an additional 10,000 pipes were installed, bringing the total number of pipes today to 28,750. The instrument is of the American Symphonic school of design, intended to combine traditional organ resources with the tone colors and beauty of the symphony orchestra. Once a year, usually in June, "Wanamaker Organ Day" is held. This free festival lasts most of the day.

==== Wanamaker Eagle ====
John Wanamaker purchased a bronze bird sculpture by August Gaul, following the sculpture's exhibition in America in 1904 at the Louisiana Purchase Exposition. The 2,500 lb (1,100 kg) sculpture is a focal point of the store's Grand Court. The sculpture is placed above a steel beam because of its weight. Known as the "Wanamaker Eagle", it became a famous meeting place and "Meet me at the Eagle" became a popular Philadelphia catchphrase.

==== Christmas Light Show ====
In November 1955, the store tapped lighting designer, Frederick Yost, to create seasonal displays. Yost designed the "Holiday Light Show" for the Grand Court, creating a more-contemporary display than previous years. Since then, the light show has become an annual tradition for generations of Philadelphians. In the 21st century, the light show has been modernized, but has retained the look and feel of the original. Since 2006, the "Macy's Dickens Village" has been located on the store's third floor, continuing a Christmas tradition that had begun at Strawbridge's in 1985.

==== Expansion ====
Wanamaker expanded to New York City in 1896, continuing a mercantile business originally started by Alexander Turney Stewart. He expanded internationally with the Wanamaker European import houses in London and Paris.

Wanamaker was a proponent of the power of advertising, though modest and with an enduring reputation for honesty. Although he did not invent the fixed price system, he is credited for the creation of the price tag; he popularized it as the industry standard. He also started the "money-back guarantee" that is now standard business practice.

He provided his employees with free medical care, education, recreational facilities, pensions and profit-sharing plans before such benefits were considered standard. Labor activists, however, knew him as a fierce opponent of unionization. During an 1887 organizing drive by the Knights of Labor, he fired the first twelve union members who were discovered by his detectives.

Wanamaker was the first retailer to place a half-page newspaper ad (1874) and the first full-page ad (1879). He initially wrote his own ad copy, but later hired the world's first full-time copywriter John Emory Powers. During Powers's tenure, Wanamaker's revenues doubled from $4 million to $8 million. Wanamaker supposedly said "Half the money I spend on advertising is wasted; the trouble is I don't know which half."

== Postmaster General ==
In 1889, Wanamaker began the First Penny Savings Bank in order to encourage thrift. The same year, he was appointed United States Postmaster General by President Benjamin Harrison; he was accused by the newspapers of the day of buying the post. Wanamaker was credited by his friends with introducing the first commemorative stamp and many efficiencies to the Postal Service. He was the first to make plans for free rural postal service in the United States, although the plan was not implemented until 1896.

In 1890, Wanamaker persuaded Congress to pass an act prohibiting the sale of lottery tickets through the mail, and then he aggressively pursued violators. Those actions effectively ended all state lotteries in the US until they reappeared in 1964, partly as an effort to undermine organized crime.

Wanamaker's tenure at the Post Office was riddled with controversy. He fired some 30,000 postal workers under the then common "spoils system" during his four-year term, as it was customary for a change in political administrations to lead to new appointments for their own supporters. The changeover of so many employees caused severe confusion, inefficiency, and a run-in with civil-service crusader Theodore Roosevelt, a fellow Republican.

In 1890, Wanamaker commissioned a series of stamps that were derided in the national media as the poorest quality stamps ever issued, both for printing quality and materials. When his department store ordered advance copies of the newly translated novel The Kreutzer Sonata by Leo Tolstoy, the deadline was missed, and only the regular discount was offered by the publisher. He retaliated by banning the book from the US Mail on grounds of obscenity.

He was ridiculed for this action by many major U.S. newspapers. In 1891, he ordered changes in the uniforms of letter carriers, and was accused of arranging for all the uniforms to be ordered from a single firm in Baltimore, to which he was believed to have financial ties. In 1893 he made a public prediction at the Chicago World's Fair that U.S. mail would still rely on stagecoach and horseback delivery for a century to come, failing to anticipate the effects of trains, the automobile, and related truck vehicles.

During World War I, Wanamaker publicly proposed that the United States buy Belgium from Germany for the sum of one-hundred billion dollars, as an alternative to the continuing carnage of the war.

Wanamaker was a presidential elector in the 1888 and 1920 presidential elections.

Wanamaker was the last surviving member of President Benjamin Harrison's cabinet.

== Philanthropy ==
Wanamaker was known for his philanthropy to programs to aid the poor in Philadelphia. He co-founded Sunday Breakfast Rescue Mission (now Philly House), a homeless shelter and soup kitchen, in 1878. The Sunday Breakfast Rescue Mission has since expanded to provide more services and still supports the homeless population of Philadelphia. In December 1915 Wanamaker purchased the Empire Theatre at Broad St. and Fairmont Ave, and used his wealth to transform it into a new local headquarters for the Salvation Army (SA) known as the Salvation Army Memorial Building (opened May 1917). The building remained the SA's Philadelphia headquarters until it was demolished in March 1970.

He was an avid collector of art and antiquities. He made several donations to the University of Pennsylvania Museum of Archaeology and Anthropology.

Among the donations was a collection of bronze reproductions of artifacts uncovered from the ruins of Pompeii and Herculaneum, known as the Wanamaker Bronzes, which Wanamaker had commissioned by the Chiurazzi Foundry in Naples for the museum.

== Personal life ==
In 1860, Wanamaker married Mary Erringer Brown.

They had six children, two of whom died in childhood:

- Thomas Brown Wanamaker (1862–1908), who married Mary Lowber Welch (1864–1929)
- Lewis Rodman Wanamaker (1863–1928), who married Fernanda de Henry and Violet Cruger
- Horace Wanamaker (born 1864), died in infancy during the American Civil War
- Harriett E. "Nettie" Wanamaker (1865–1870)
- Mary Brown "Minnie" Wanamaker (1869–1954), who married Barclay Harding Warburton
- Elizabeth "Lillie" Wanamaker (1876–1927), who married Norman McLeod

In 1899, Wanamaker's son, Thomas, who specialized in store financial matters, purchased The North American, a Philadelphia-based newspaper. He irritated his father by publishing regular columns by radical intellectuals, including Henry George, Jr., socialist Henry John Nelson, who later became Emma Goldman's lawyer, and socialist Caroline H. Pemberton. The younger Wanamaker also began publishing a Sunday edition, which offended his father's sense of keeping the Sabbath holy.

His younger son Rodman, a Princeton University graduate, lived in France early in his career. He is credited with creating a demand for French luxury goods in Philadelphia and the United States that persists to this day. Rodman was credited with the artistic quality that gave the Wanamaker stores their cachet. He was also a patron of fine music, organizing spectacular organ and orchestra concerts in the Wanamaker Philadelphia and New York City stores under music director Alexander Russell.

== Death ==
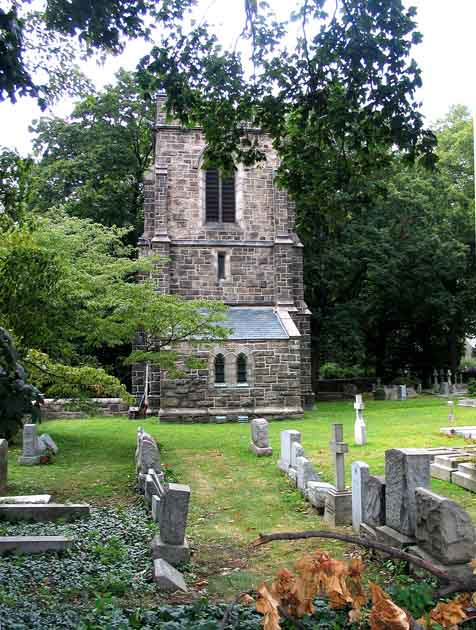
The Wanamaker family tomb in the churchyard of the Church of St. James the Less in Philadelphia

Wanamaker died on December 12, 1922. His funeral was on December 14, 1922, with a service at the Bethany Presbyterian Church. He was interred in the Wanamaker family tomb in the churchyard of the Church of St. James the Less in Philadelphia.

At his death, his estate was estimated to be US$100 million ($1,923,459,245 today), divided equally among his three living children and granddaughters, Mary "Minnie" Wanamaker Warburton (Mrs. Barclay Warburton), Patricia "Paddy" W. Estelle, and Elizabeth Wanamaker McLeod, who all received substantial stock, real estate and cash instruments. Second son Rodman was made sole inheritor of the store businesses.

Rodman Wanamaker died in 1928, leaving the businesses with a documented worth of $36.7 million ($673,210,736 today) in a trust. Rodman is credited with founding the Professional Golfers' Association of America and the Millrose Games.

The senior Wanamaker's first son, Thomas B. Wanamaker, died in Paris in 1908.

== Legacy ==
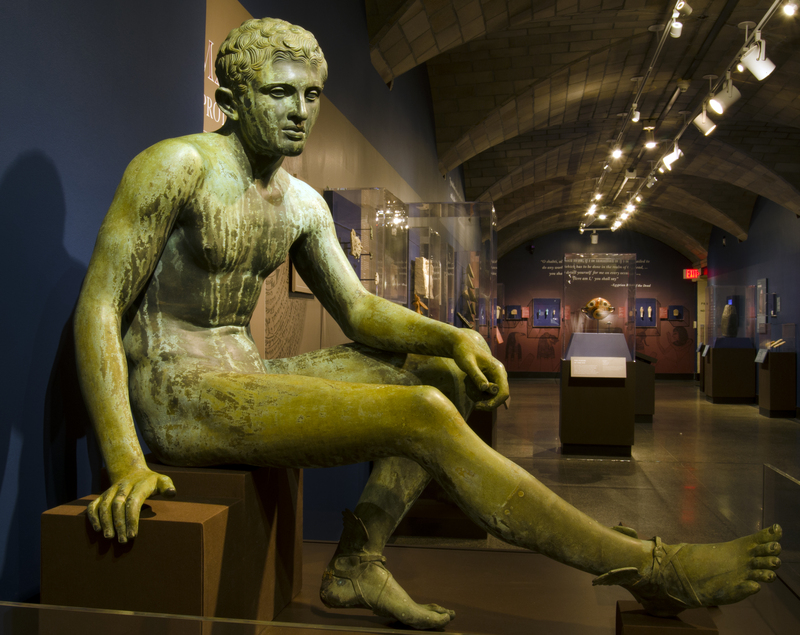
A statue reproduction of Seated Hermes commissioned by Wanamaker on display in the Penn Museum

His country estate, Lindenhurst mansion in Cheltenham Township, Pennsylvania, was located on York Road below Washington Lane at (40.0853°N 75.1311°W). The original mansion was designed by architect E. A. Sargent of New York City. President Harrison visited Wanamaker at the Lindenhurst mansion.

A neoclassic mansion was constructed when the original Victorian Lindenhurst burned in 1907, destroying much of Wanamaker's art collection. A railroad station, Chelten Hills located below Jenkintown, and no longer in existence, was constructed on the property in addition to his vast mansion. Part of the former estate became the campus of Salus University.

A family trust owned the Wanamaker's store chain, run by a trustee system set up by Rodman Wanamaker's will. In 1978, the business was sold to Carter Hawley Hale, Inc. The 15-store chain was sold to Woodward & Lothrop in 1986, and the downtown store was renamed as Lord & Taylor. Woodies declared bankruptcy in 1994, and with it went the Wanamaker stores, which were sold to May Department Stores Company on June 21, 1995. In August 2006 the flagship Philadelphia store was converted from a Lord & Taylor to a Macy's.

- Bronze busts honoring Wanamaker and other industry magnates stand between the Chicago River and the Merchandise Mart in downtown Chicago, Illinois.
- A popular saying illustrating how difficult it was to quantify the response to advertising is attributed to Wanamaker: "Half the money I spend on advertising is wasted; the trouble is I don't know which half." See John Emory Powers
- Beginning in 1908, Wanamaker financed Anna Jarvis's campaign to have a national Mother's Day holiday officially recognized. On May 8, 1914, the U.S. Congress passed a law designating the second Sunday in May as Mother's Day, which also later became an international holiday. A dedicated Pennsylvania historic marker honoring Jarvis and Wanamaker is located at Philadelphia City Hall, across the street from Wanamaker's store, where the earliest Mother's Day ceremonies were held.
- Wanamaker's fame was considerable around the world in his heyday. In the original play Pygmalion (1912) by George Bernard Shaw, Alfred Doolittle is left a legacy by an American philanthropist millionaire named "Ezra Wanafeller", combining Wanamaker's name with John D. Rockefeller, Sr.
- Wanamaker owned homes in Philadelphia, Cape May Point and Bay Head in New Jersey, New York City, Florida, London, Paris, and Biarritz. He had a townhouse at 2032 Walnut Street in Philadelphia, which was designed similar to an English manor house and held a Welte Philharmonic Organ. He died in this residence. The facade of this building is still extant. During the 1980 construction of the new Wanamaker House high rise on the adjacent property on Walnut Street, the facade of the original Wanamaker house was closely monitored to ensure its preservation. This monitoring was performed by the Engineering firm, Boucher and James, Inc. Dale Leonard, professional land surveyor. Thomas Edison, a close friend, was an honorary pallbearer at his funeral (there were 150 of them).
- Wanamaker was instrumental in the foundation of the Williamson College of the Trades (originally, 'Williamson Free School of Mechanical Trades') in Elwyn, PA. It was named for his friend and mentor, Isaiah Vansant Williamson. Williamson died in 1889, shortly after he founded the school. Wanamaker was the chairman of the school's first board of trustees, who realized Williamson's vision and planning for the school. The board held a competition for the design of the original campus buildings and selected famed Philadelphia architect, Frank Furness (Furness, Evans & Company). Wanamaker has been memorialized in many ways at the school, most conspicuously in The John Wanamaker Free School of Artisans, which encompasses the instructional trade workshops and is considered the heart of the college. A dormitory, foundations, and groups are also named in his honor. Wanamaker privately wrote a biography of Williamson titled, Life of Isaiah V. Williamson, which was published posthumously in 1928.
- Wanamaker was a Pennsylvania Mason. The John Wanamaker Masonic Humanitarian Medal was created by resolution of the Grand Lodge of Pennsylvania at the December Quarterly Communication of 1993. The medal, also called "The Wanamaker Medal" is to be awarded to a person (male or female) who, being a non-Mason, supports the ideals and philosophy of the Masonic Fraternity. At the discretion of the R. W. Grand Master, the medal is awarded to one who personifies the high ideals of John Wanamaker–a public spirited citizen, a lover of all people, and devoted to doing good. The medal has been presented sparingly to maintain the great prestige associated with an award created by resolution of the Pennsylvania Grand Lodge.
- Wanamaker was instrumental in the vision and planning of the Benjamin Franklin Parkway in Philadelphia.

== See also ==
- Luther Standing Bear
- Owney (dog)
- The Book News Monthly
- Timothy Eaton
- Wanamaker Organ
- Wanamaker's Department Store
- 1899 United States Senate election in Pennsylvania

Political offices
Preceded by Donald M. Dickinson	United States Postmaster General; 1889–1893	Succeeded by Wilson S. Bissell
