= SVF Foundation =

American rare breeds nonprofit organization

- Formation: 1998
- Type: Non-profit
- Purpose: Scientific
- Location: Newport, Rhode Island
- Website: svffoundation.org

The SVF Foundation is a 501(c)(3) nonprofit organization that seeks to preserve rare breeds of livestock. It is the only private organization in the United States that preserves rare livestock by gathering and storing both semen and embryos of the animals in its collection, a technique called cryopreservation.

== History and facilities ==
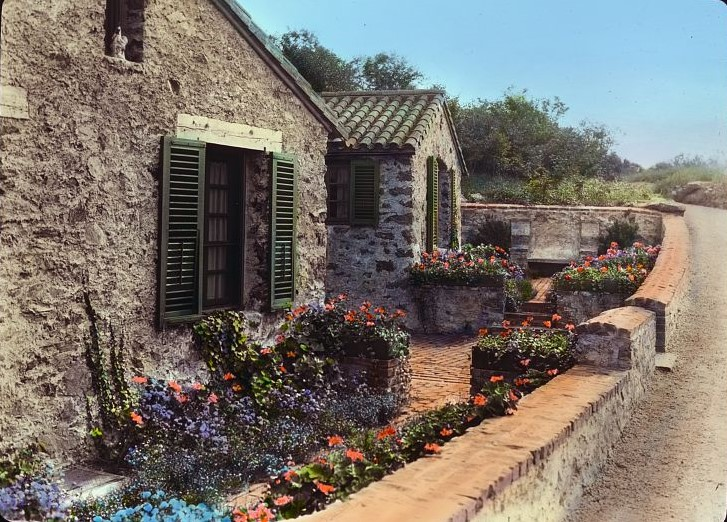
Early twentieth century view of Surprise Valley Farm buildings, which now house facilities devoted to cryopreservation

SVF, which stands for "Swiss Village Farm", is located in Newport, Rhode Island, and has facilities both for housing live herds and for cryopreservation on its 45 acres. Live animals are also available for sale to farmers and ranchers to increase the practical use of rare breeds in modern agriculture. It is not open to the public except for one day a year, as a strict biosecurity measure.

SVF was founded by Dorrance Hill Hamilton, the billionaire heir to the Campbell Soup Company fortune and one of the wealthiest Americans according to Forbes. The Newport property on which it is housed was built by railroad magnate Arthur Curtiss James in the early 1900s and was purchased by Hamilton in 1998.

== Preservation work ==
Likened to an "animal seed bank", the foundation had about 45,000 samples of germplasm from sheep, goats, and cattle as of 2010.

Much of the cryopreservation work at SVF Foundation is accomplished with the help of the Cummings School of Veterinary Medicine at Tufts University, and a Tufts veterinarian is the foundation's chief scientist. This work began in 1999, and in 2004, the Foundation had its first successful birth of a preserved rare-breed embryo — a Tennessee fainting goat — by a host mother of a different breed.

== See also ==
- The Livestock Conservancy
- Ark of Taste
