= Isaiah Vansant Williamson =

American merchant & philanthropist (1803–1889)

I. V. Williamson
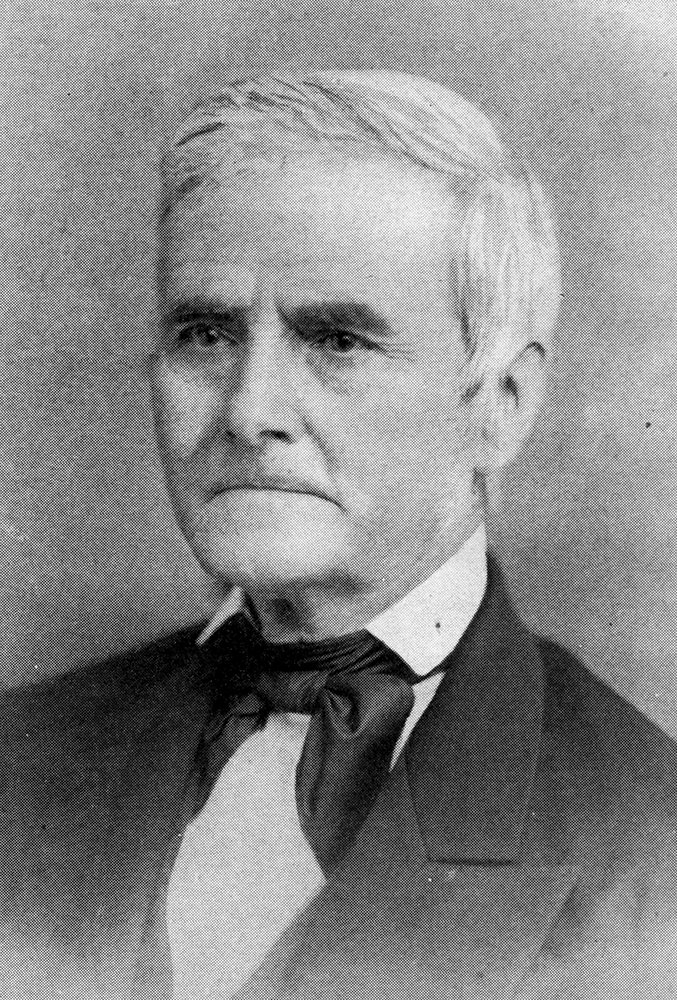
- Born: February 4, 1803; Bensalem Township, Pennsylvania, U.S.
- Died: March 7, 1889 (aged 86); Philadelphia, Pennsylvania, U.S.
- Occupation: Merchant
- Known for: Philanthropy

Isaiah Vansant Williamson (February 4, 1803 – March 7, 1889), commonly known as I. V. Williamson, was an American merchant and philanthropist from Pennsylvania.

== Early life ==
Williamson was born in Bensalem Township, Pennsylvania, on February 4, 1803, to Mahlon and Charity (Vansant) Williamson and in 1807 moved with his family to Fallsington. There he attended the Friends' School and worked on his family's farm. He became apprenticed to Harvey Gillingham at Gillingham Store in the center of Fallsington for six or seven years. In this position, he traveled to the surrounding communities and Philadelphia, where he learned the trade of buying and selling various goods. In 1825, he moved to Philadelphia and got a position as a salesman there.

== Career ==
Saving and investing his earnings, he eventually became partner in Williamson, Burroughs & Co. selling dry-goods to local shops, where he made a large amount of his fortune.

== Personality and philanthropies ==
Williamson was extremely shy. According to legend, he could not complete a marriage ceremony because he was too embarrassed to face his bride at the altar.. Due to the way he dressed and walked through the city, he was sometimes referred to as the "threadbare philanthropist." It has been difficult to determine how much Williamson gave because most of his donations were made anonymously under the pseudonym “Hez.” His large sums of money went to hospitals, including the Hospital of the University of Pennsylvania in the 1870s and founding the Williamson Free School of Mechanical Trades with $5,000,000, December 1, 1888, a gift "larger than the entire endowment of Harvard, Yale or Columbia."

== Death ==
Isaiah V. Williamson died in Philadelphia on March 7, 1889, due to aortic valvular disease.
