= Arthur Curtiss James House =

Former mansion in New York City

Coordinates: 40°46′10.27″N 73°57′56.94″W

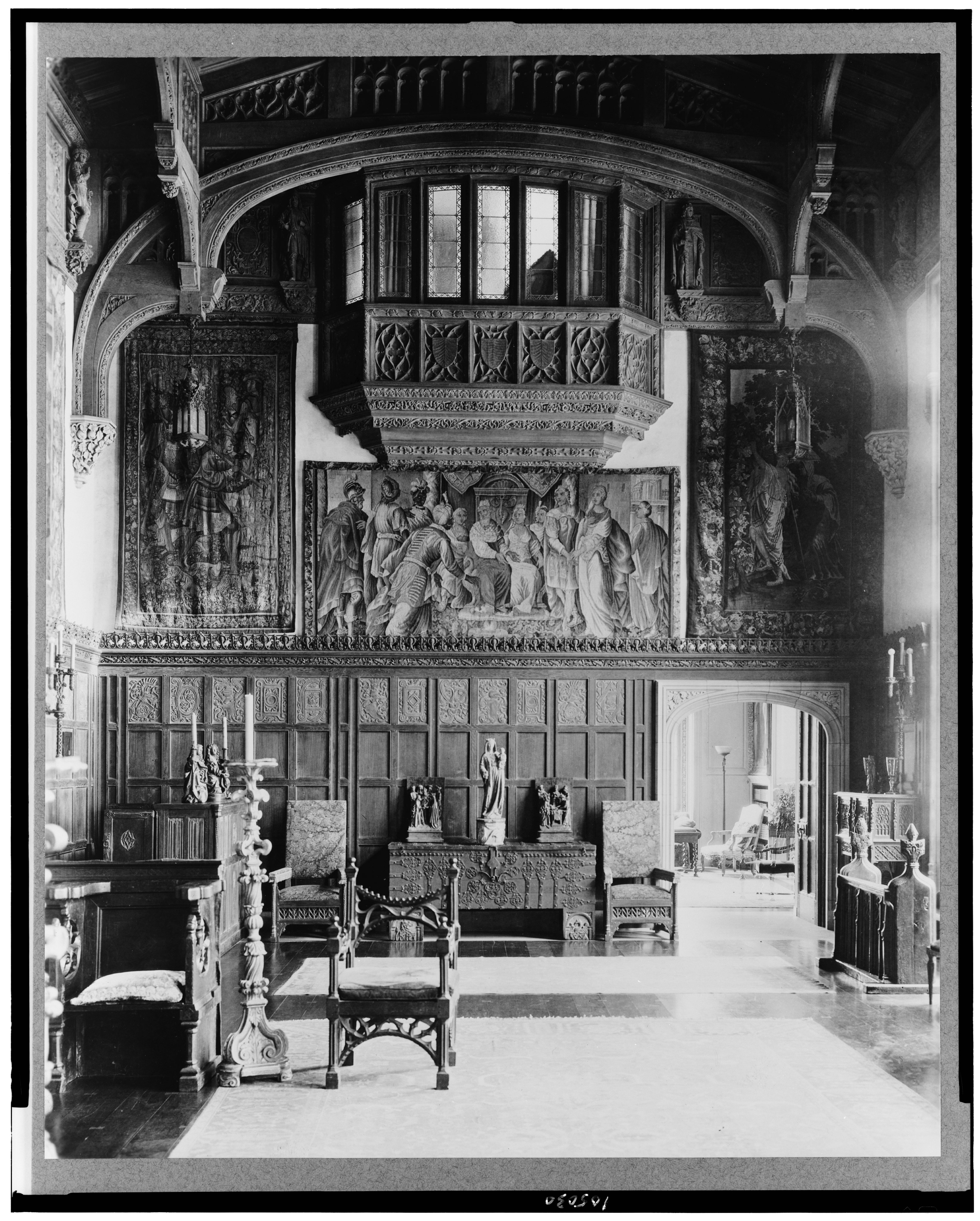
Interior of the Arthur Curtiss James House, 39 East 69th Street, New York City

The Arthur Curtiss James House was a mansion located on 39 East 69th Street in New York City. It was constructed for Arthur Curtiss James.
