= USS Edorea =

Patrol vessel of the United States Navy

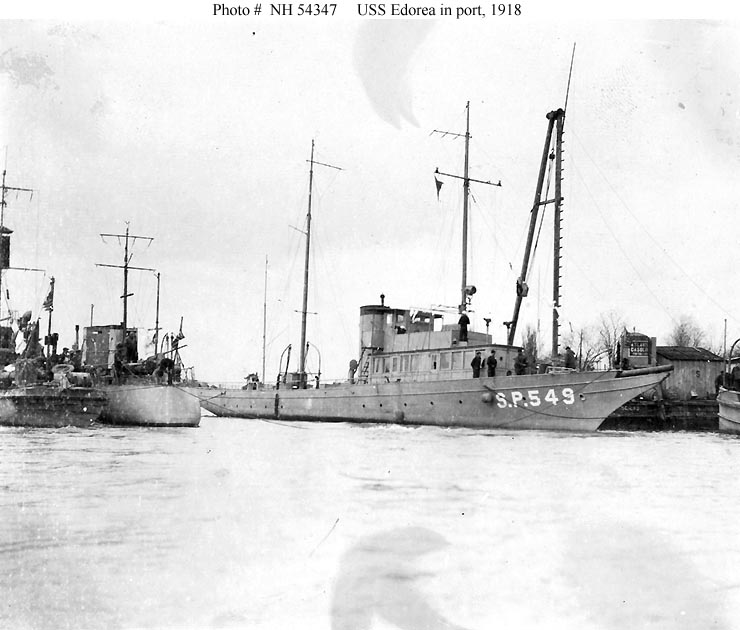
- USS Edorea (SP-549) in an icy port in 1918, probably in the Delaware Bay area. Other section patrol vessels are at left.

History

United States
- Name: USS Edorea
- Namesake: Previous name retained
- Builder: George Lawley & Son, Neponset, Massachusetts
- Completed: 1909
- Acquired: 1917
- Commissioned: 27 July 1917
- Decommissioned: 10 December 1918
- Fate: Returned to owner
- Notes: Operated as private motor yacht Monaloa and Edorea 1909–1917 and Edorea from 1919

General characteristics
- Type: Patrol vessel
- Tonnage: 104 gross register tons
- Length: 137 ft 4 in (41.86 m)
- Beam: 15 ft 8 in (4.78 m)
- Draft: 7 ft 8 in (2.34 m)
- Speed: 13 knots
- Complement: 25
- Armament: 1 × 3-pounder gun

USS Edorea (SP-549) was a United States Navy patrol vessel in commission from 1917 to 1918.

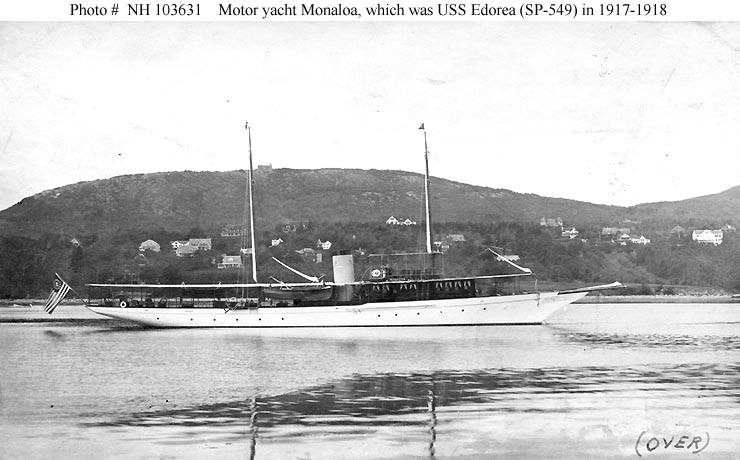
Edorea as the private motor yacht Monaloa prior to World War I.

Edorea was built as the private motor yacht Monaloa by George Lawley & Son at Neponset, Massachusetts in 1909. She later was renamed Edorea.

In 1917, the U.S. Navy acquired Edorea under a free lease from her owner for use as a section patrol vessel during World War I. She was commissioned as USS Edorea (SP-549) on 27 July 1917.

Assigned to the 4th Naval District, Edorea operated on convoy escort and patrol duties in the Cape May, New Jersey, area for the rest of World War I. She also escorted U.S. Navy submarines to sea for target practice.

Edorea was decommissioned on 10 December 1918 and returned to her owner.
