= The Book News Monthly =

Defunct American magazine

- Frequency: Monthly
- Publisher: John Wanamaker
- First issue: 1882
- Final issue: 1918
- Country: United States
- Language: English

The Book News Monthly was a monthly journal published by John Wanamaker from 1882 to 1918. It was called Book News: A Monthly Survey until 1906. Ezra Pound was an occasional contributor.
