= Dorrance Hill Hamilton =

American philanthropist (1928–2017)

Dorrance "Dodo" Hill Hamilton (August 16, 1928 – April 18, 2017) was an American heiress of the Campbell Soup fortune and philanthropist who founded the SVF Foundation in Newport, Rhode Island and preserved Hammersmith Farm. She was one of the wealthiest Americans according to Forbes, and a billionaire in 2005 to 2007 (at least). She had homes in Wayne, Pennsylvania, Boca Grande, Florida, Surry, Virginia and Newport, Rhode Island.

== Personal life ==
Marie Louise Dorrance Hill was born in Lenox Hill, New York City on August 16, 1928, to Nathaniel Peter Hill and Elinor Winifred Dorrance. She attended Foxcroft School, a boarding school for young ladies in Virginia. She married Samuel Matthews Vauclain Hamilton Sr. in 1950. She had three children, nine grandchildren and four great-grandchildren. Hamilton was a granddaughter of John Thompson Dorrance, who created the process for condensing soup and purchased the Campbell Soup Company from his uncle in 1914. The family still holds a large percentage of the outstanding shares of Campbell stock. Hamilton's husband Samuel M.V. Hamilton died in 1997. In 1998 Hamilton founded the SVF Foundation.

== Pier 34 Collapse ==
In 1994, acting as sole shareholder of HMS Ventures, Inc., Hill purchased the barque Moshulu which by then had been converted into a floating restaurant. In early 2000, Hill purchased Club Heat located on Philadelphia Pier 34 of the Delaware River from friend and attorney Michael Asbell. After purchasing Club Heat, Hill moored Moshulu at Pier 34 where the two enterprises operated adjacent to one another. Around 8pm on May 18, 2000, a portion of Pier 34 collapsed when the 91 year-old timber pile foundation failed, killing three people and injuring 43 others.

Subsequent investigation revealed that as early as 1978 engineers from the City of Philadelphia warned its owners that Pier 34, originally constructed in 1909, would be unfit for occupation by 1990. Asbell was subsequently warned by an engineering firm in 1995 that the site required approximately $1.2 million in renovations to make the structure safe for human occupancy. That same year a separate section of the Pier collapsed, which was eventually rebuilt as Club Heat's parking lot. Investigators discovered that in the months and weeks leading up to the fatal 2000 collapse, the owners and managers of Club Heat were repeatedly warned that the Pier existed in an unstable condition that posed a threat to human life. Workers reported that cracks as large as twelve inches wide were rapidly opening through the nightclub's floor, and that Club Heats responded to the cracks by covering them with carpets. On the morning of the fatal May 18, 2000 collapse, a construction firm hired by Club Heat's owners reported that the structure was not safe for occupancy, with an employee of the construction firm warning that the Pier could collapse within a few tide cycles.

Two Club Heat employees faced criminal charges of involuntary homicide, reckless endangerment, and risking catastrophe. Though not criminally charged herself, Hill paid the legal fees for the employees' criminal defense. In 2005 Hill entered into a global civil settlement which paid $29.5 million to the victims of the collapse.
