= Boy Bitten by a Crayfish =

Copy of a lost painting by Caravaggio

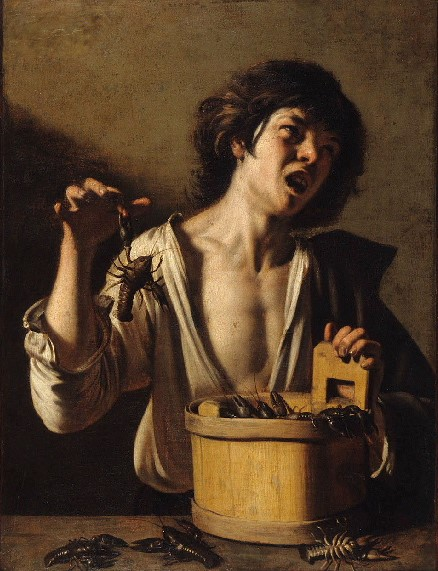
- Artist: Anonymous, after Caravaggio
- Year: between 1593 and 1600
- Medium: oil painting on canvas
- Movement: Italian Renaissance; Genre painting
- Dimensions: 98 cm × 72 cm (39 in × 28 in)
- Location: Musée des Beaux-Arts, Strasbourg
- Accession: 1931

Boy Bitten by a Crayfish is a lost painting by the Italian Baroque artist Caravaggio that is known thanks to several copies. The copy considered the most faithful belongs to the Musée des Beaux-Arts of Strasbourg, France. Its inventory number is 1285.

The Strasbourg painting has long been attributed to an anonymous Caravaggista known as Pensionante del Saraceni. However, another version of the painting, which appeared on the art market in 2013, is closer to the cooler and softer brush technique of Saraceni than the Strasbourg version. The Strasbourg version, the closest of the copies to Caravaggio's own style, is supposedly based on an original that was probably painted around 1593. Earlier attributions had suggested the authorship of Mattia Preti, but this could never be substantiated.

The Strasbourg Boy Bitten by a Crayfish had formerly belonged to the Comte de Pourtalès Collection. It was sold in Paris on 27 March 1865. At some point in time it returned to the heirs of the Count de Pourtalès, as it was later gifted to the museum in 1931 by Mrs. Bérard de Loÿs Chandieu, heiress of the Château de Pourtalès through her mother.

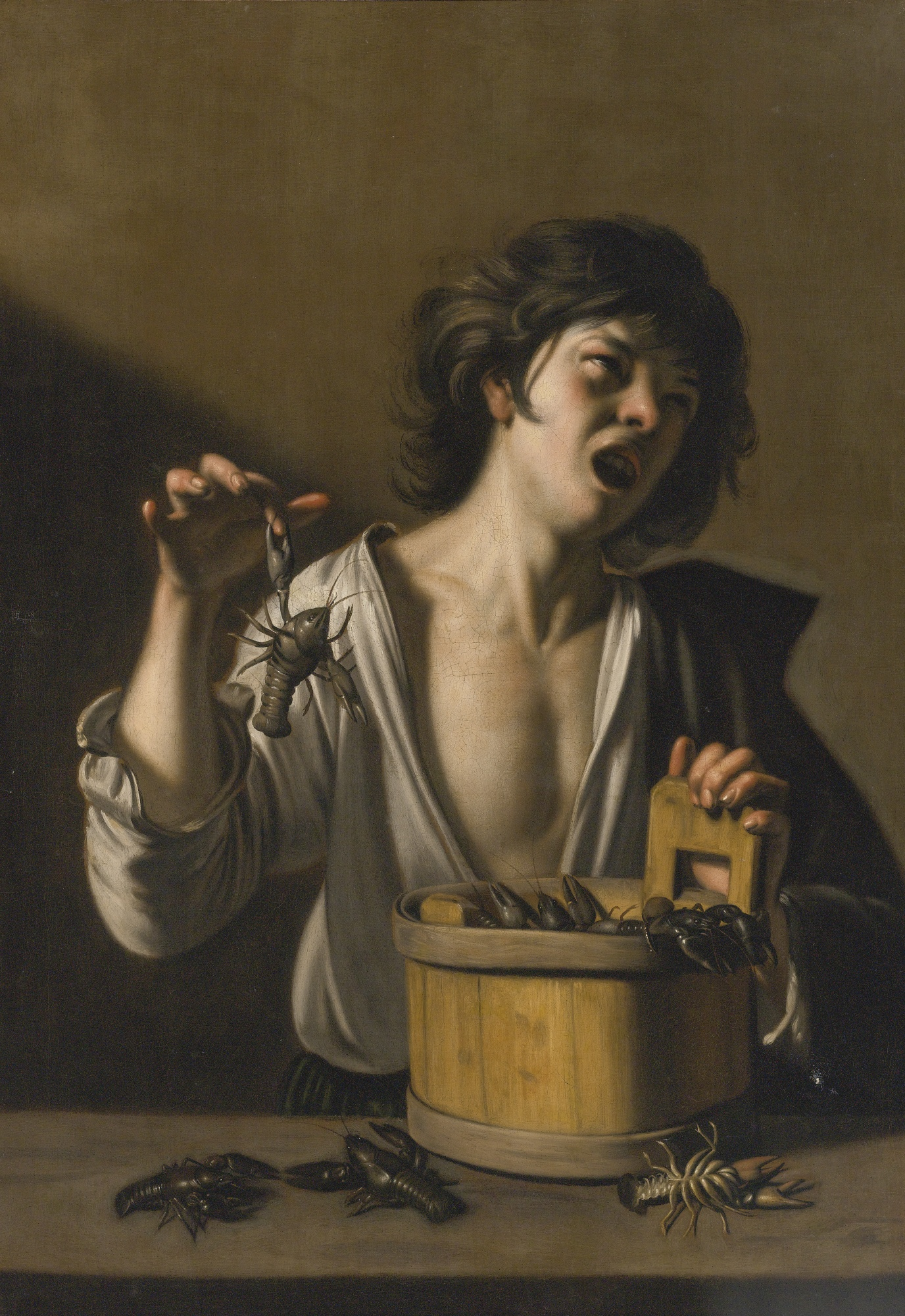
The variant appearing on the art market in 2013, possibly by Pensionante del Saraceni
