= Comte de Pourtalès Collection =

Art collection owned by James-Alexandre de Pourtalès

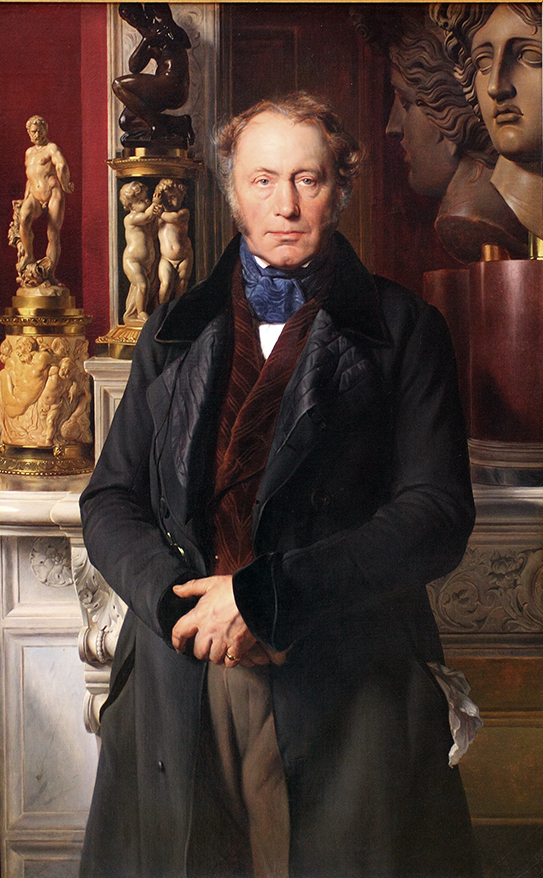
Portrait of the Comte de Pourtalès-Gorgier, by Paul Delaroche, 1846.

The Art Collection of James-Alexandre, comte de Pourtalès-Gorgier was a collection of sculpture, antiques and paintings owned by James-Alexandre de Pourtalès, Comte de Pourtalès-Gorgier until his death in 1855.

== History ==
The Comte de Pourtalès-Gorgier (1776–1855), was a Swiss-French banker who served as Chamberlain to the King of Prussia and was awarded the title of Count by King Frederick William III, who ruled Prussia during the Napoleonic Wars and the end of the Holy Roman Empire.

The collection was largely held at Hôtel de Pourtalès, his hôtel particulier (essentially a grand townhouse) on Rue Tronchet in the 8th arrondissement of Paris. The collection, which started with a vase, included the Laughing Cavalier by Frans Hals and works by Bronzino, Rembrandt, Jean-Auguste-Dominique Ingres and a Sandro Botticelli portrait. In 1825, he donated a mummy and coffin he acquired from the Thedenat-Duvent sale, to the Berlin Museum.

In February and March 1865, ten years after his death, his collection was auctioned off in Paris in accordance with his will. The majority of his collection was photographed and published in a large folio catalog by Goupil & Cie. The Laughing Cavalier was purchased by Richard Seymour-Conway, 4th Marquess of Hertford (who outbid Baron James Mayer de Rothschild). William Tyssen-Amherst, 1st Baron Amherst of Hackney bought some of the important Egyptian objects. Sir Charles Thomas Newton spent 60,919 francs on bronzes and vases for the British Museum, and 47,000 francs on Giustiniani's Apollo.

== Collection ==
Paintings

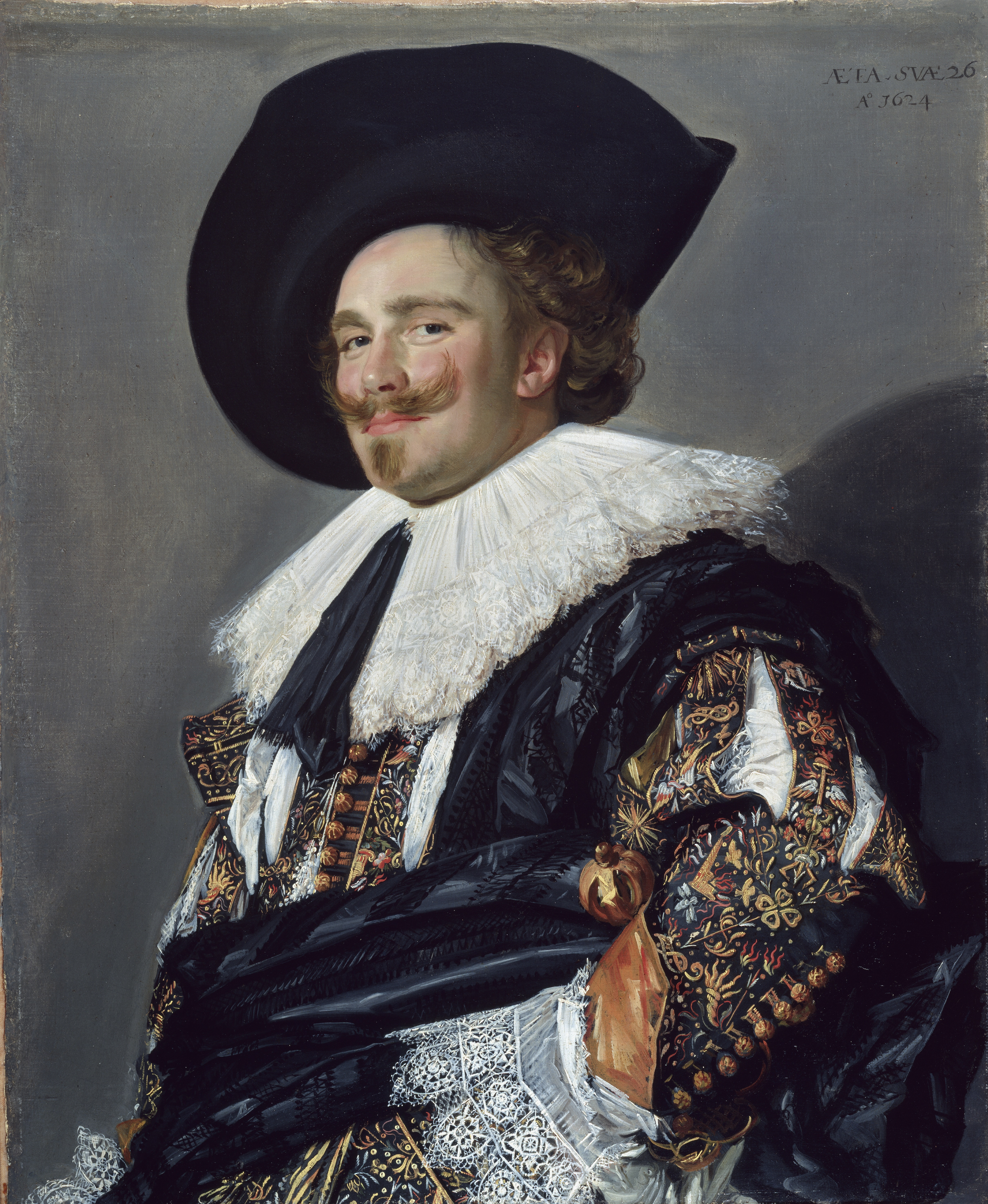
Laughing Cavalier by Frans Hals

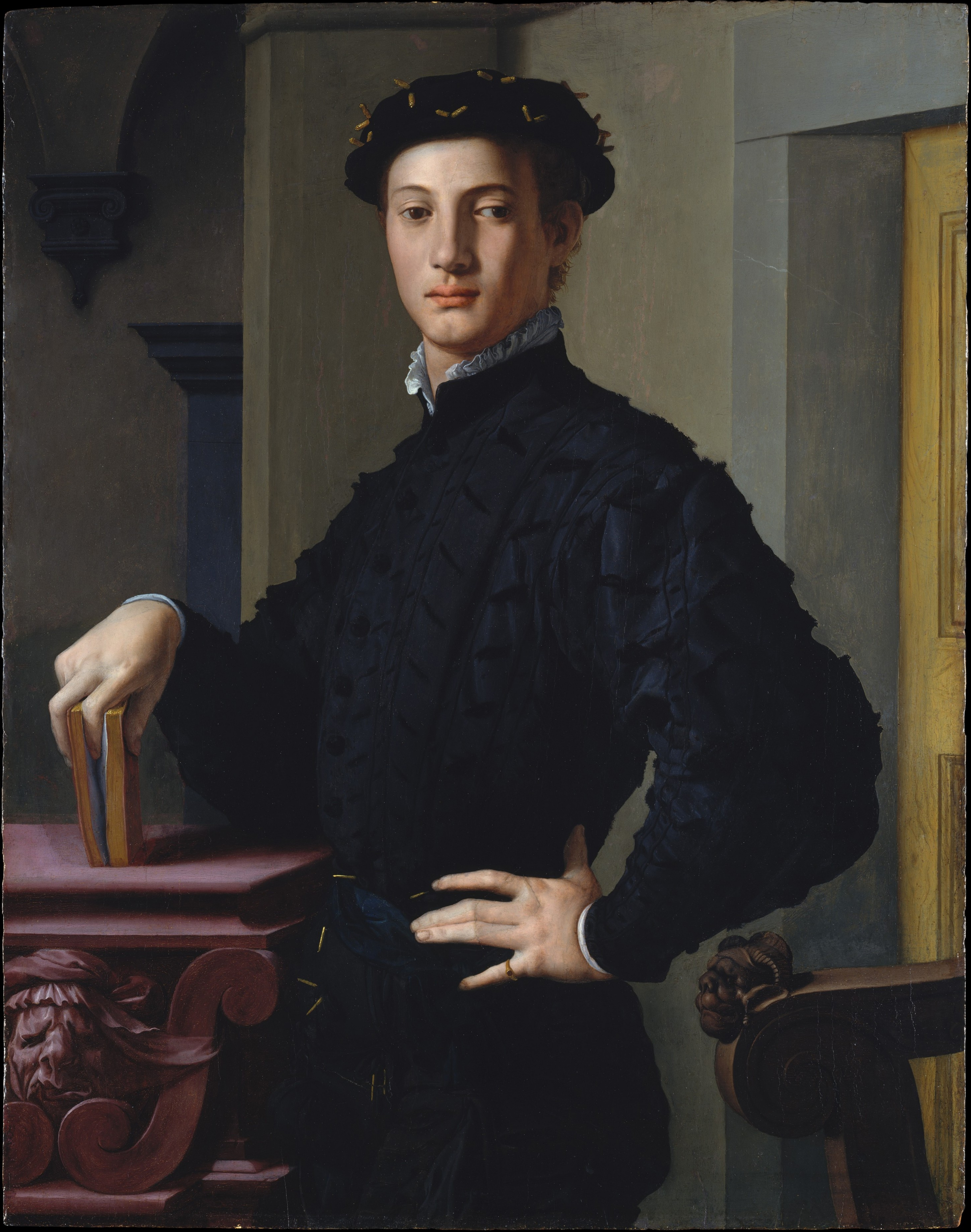
Portrait of a Young Man with a Book by Agnolo Bronzino, 1540

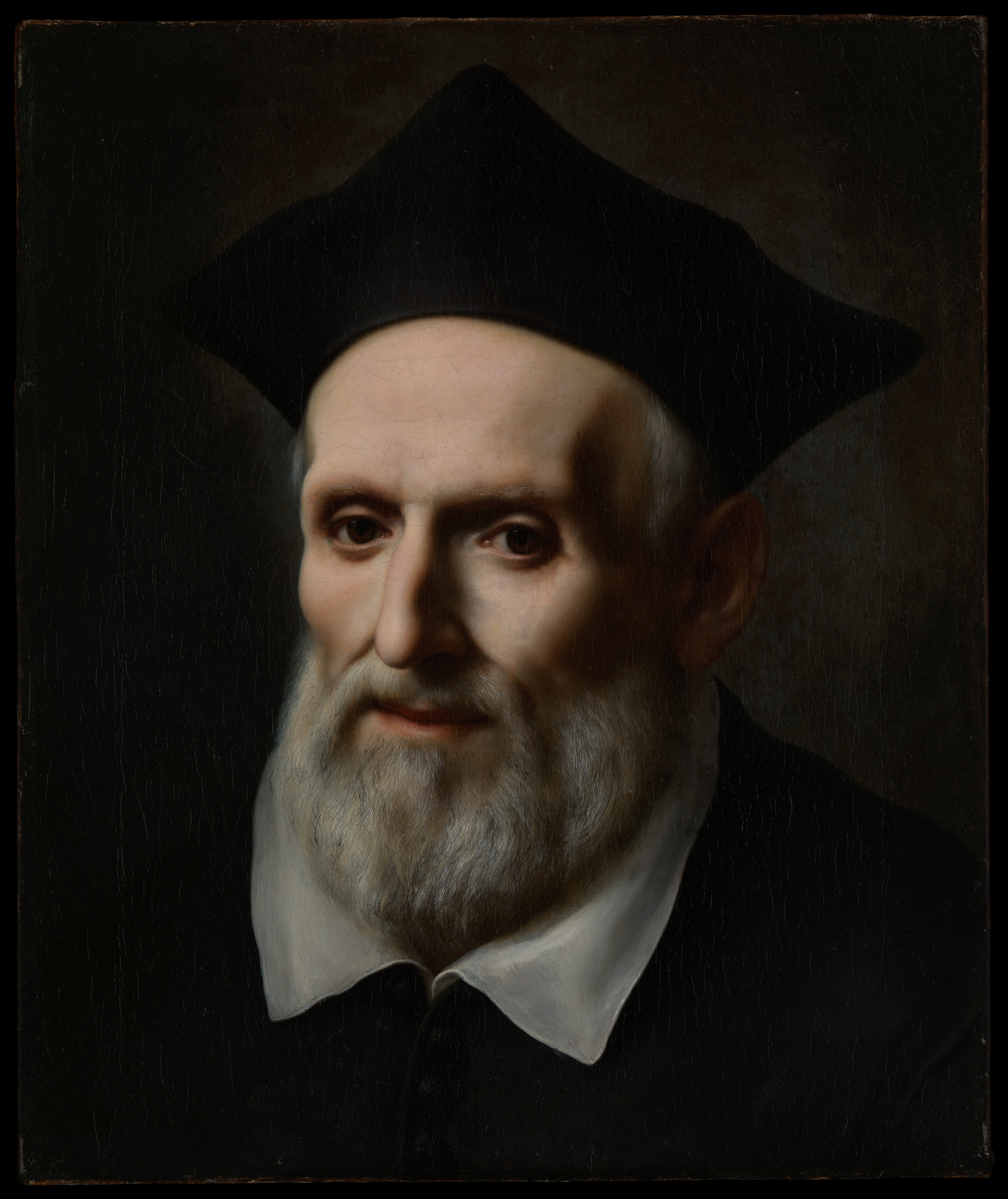
Saint Philip Neri, by Carlo Dolci, c. 1645

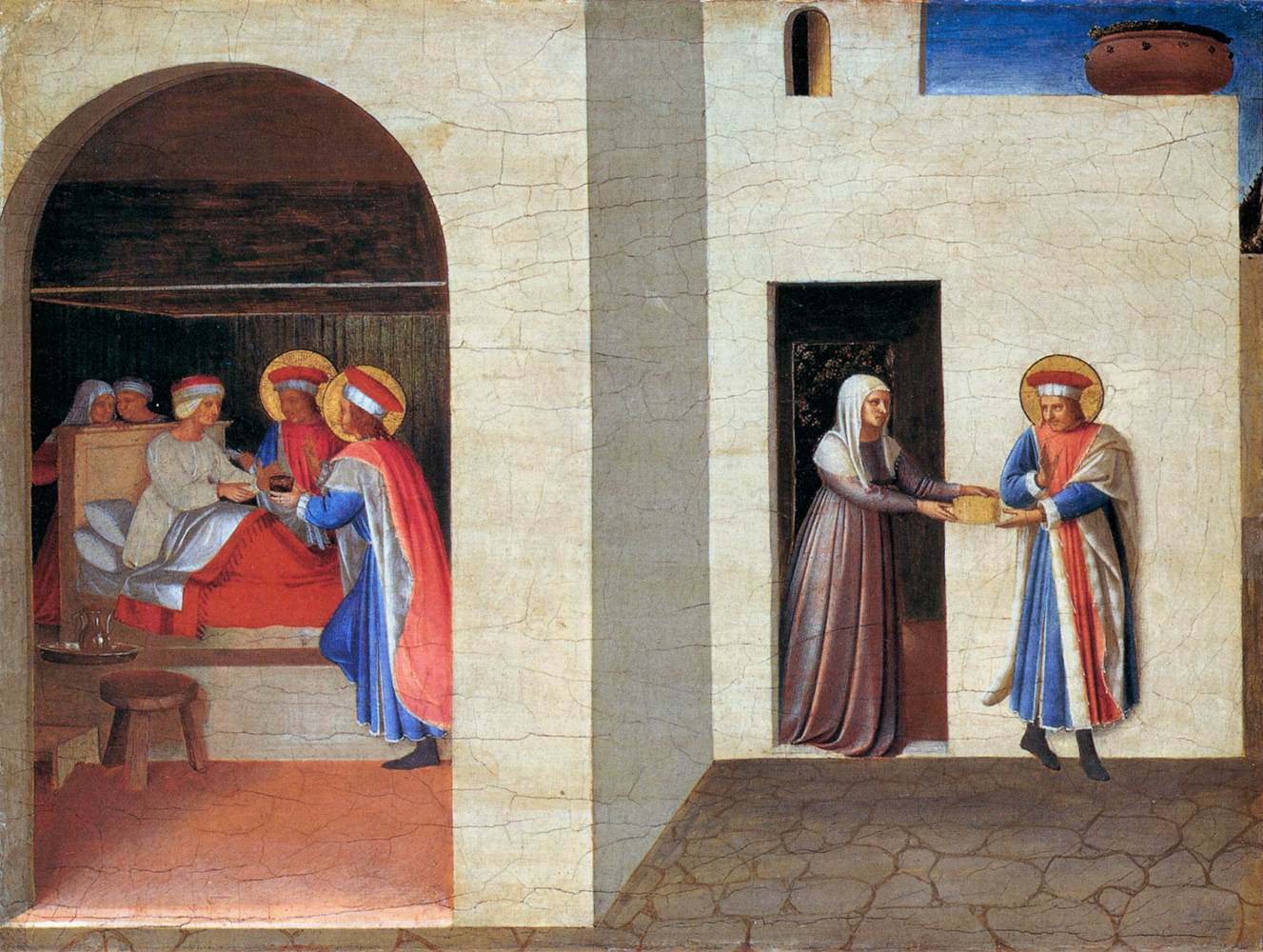
"The Healing of Palladia by Saint Cosmas and Saint Damian", by Fra Angelico, c. 1438–1440

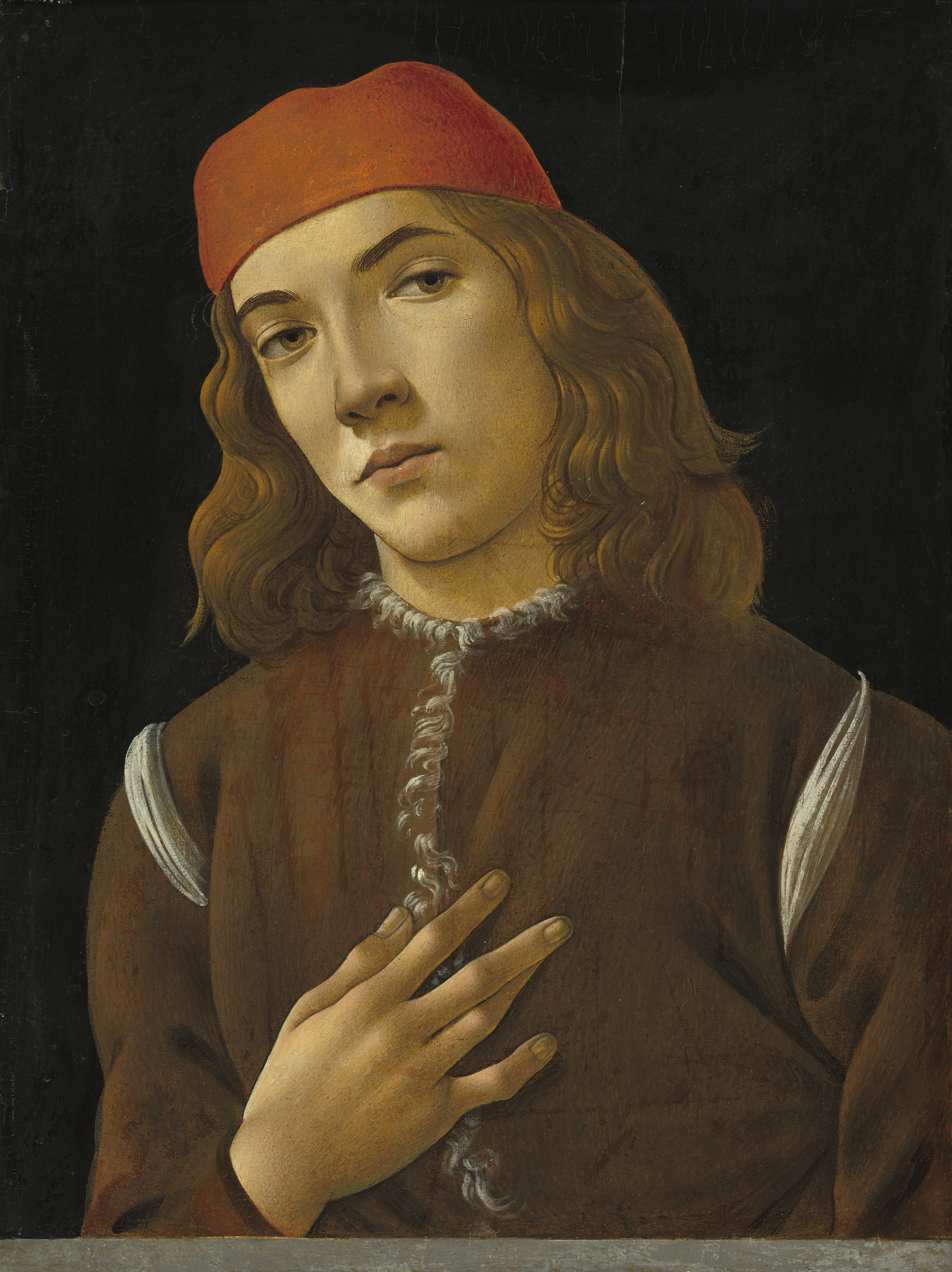
Portrait of a Youth. by Sandro Botticelli, c. 1482–1485

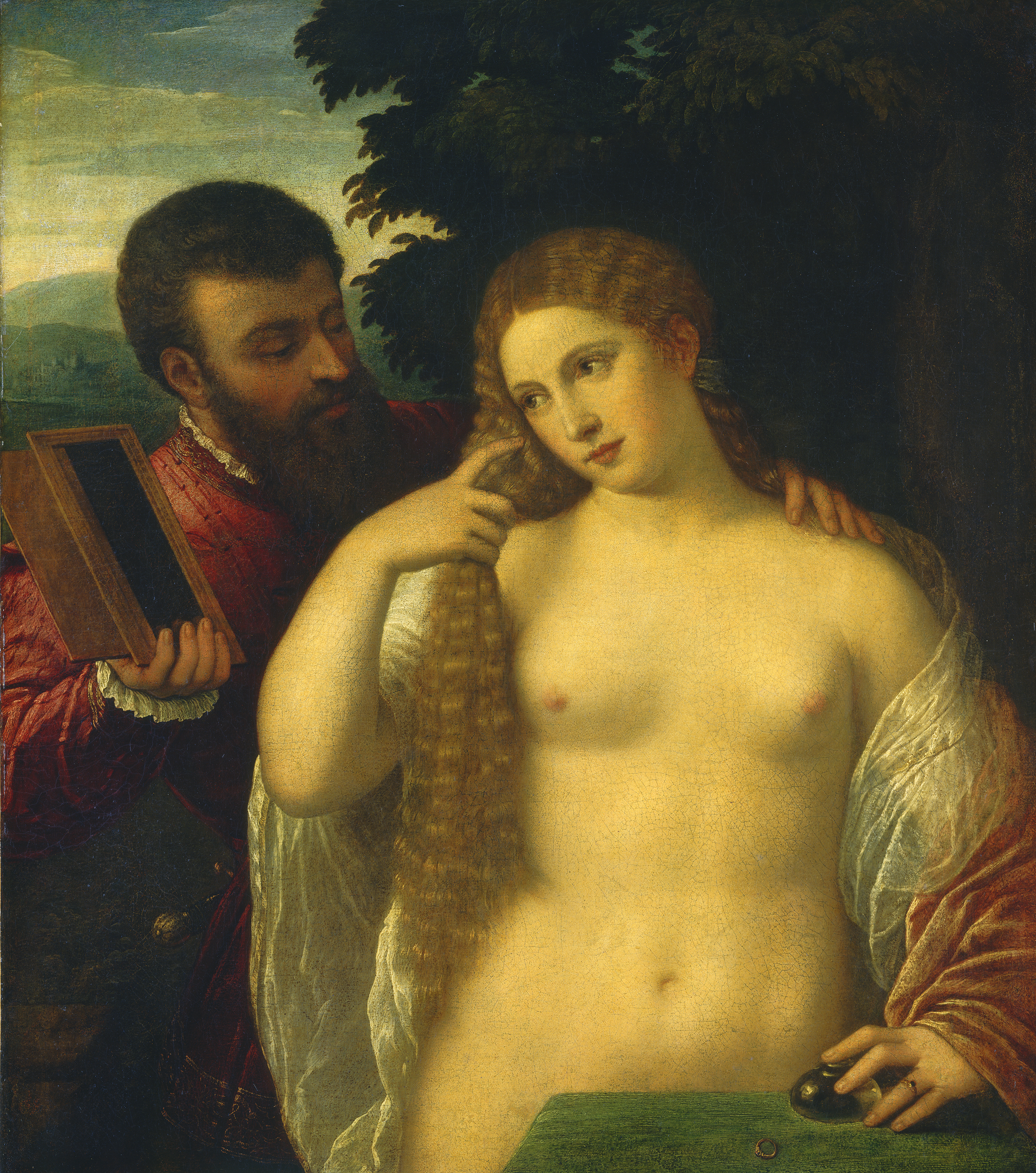
Allegory of Love, by the Workshop of Titian, c. 1520–1540

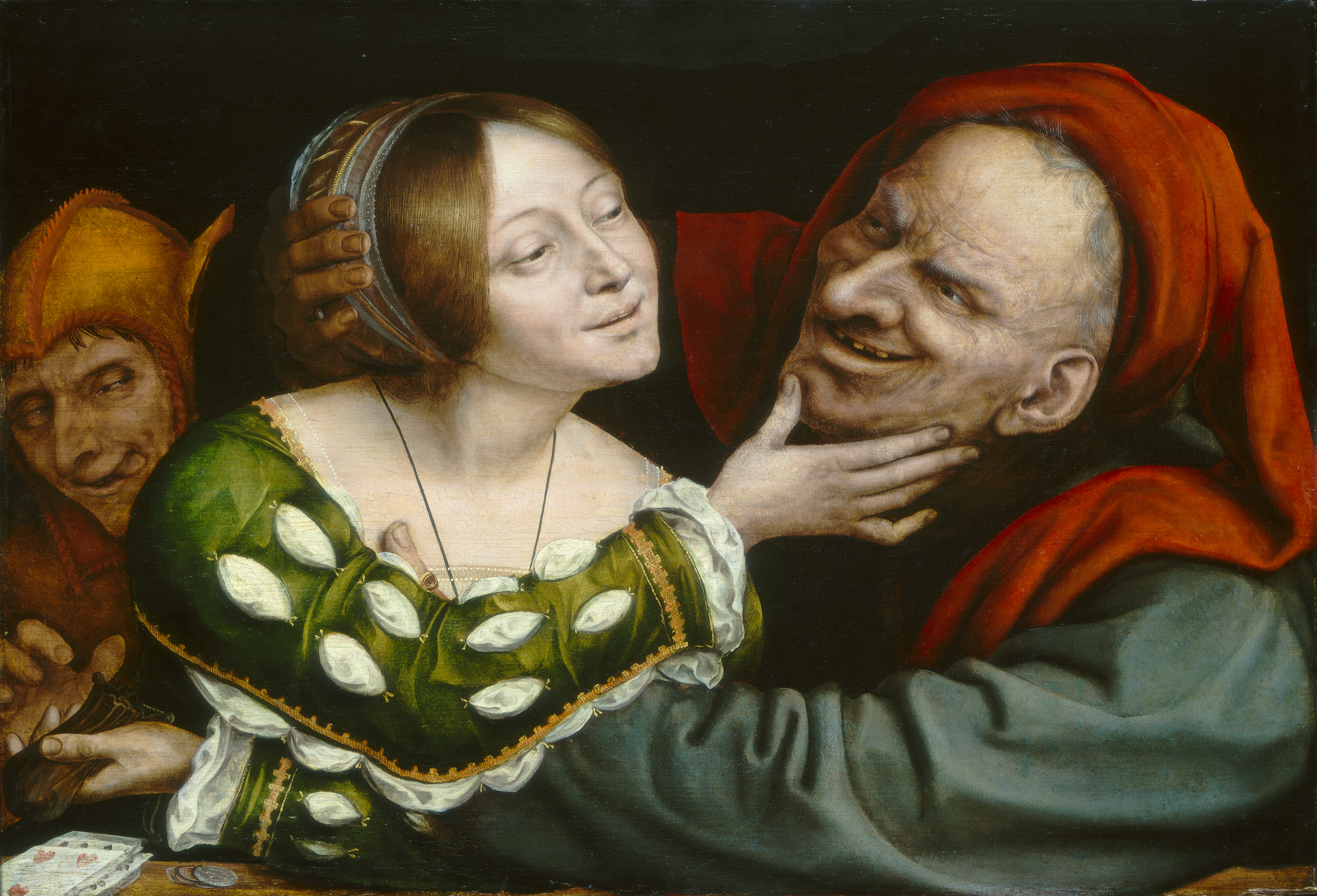
Ill-Matched Lovers, by Quentin Massys, c. 1520–1525

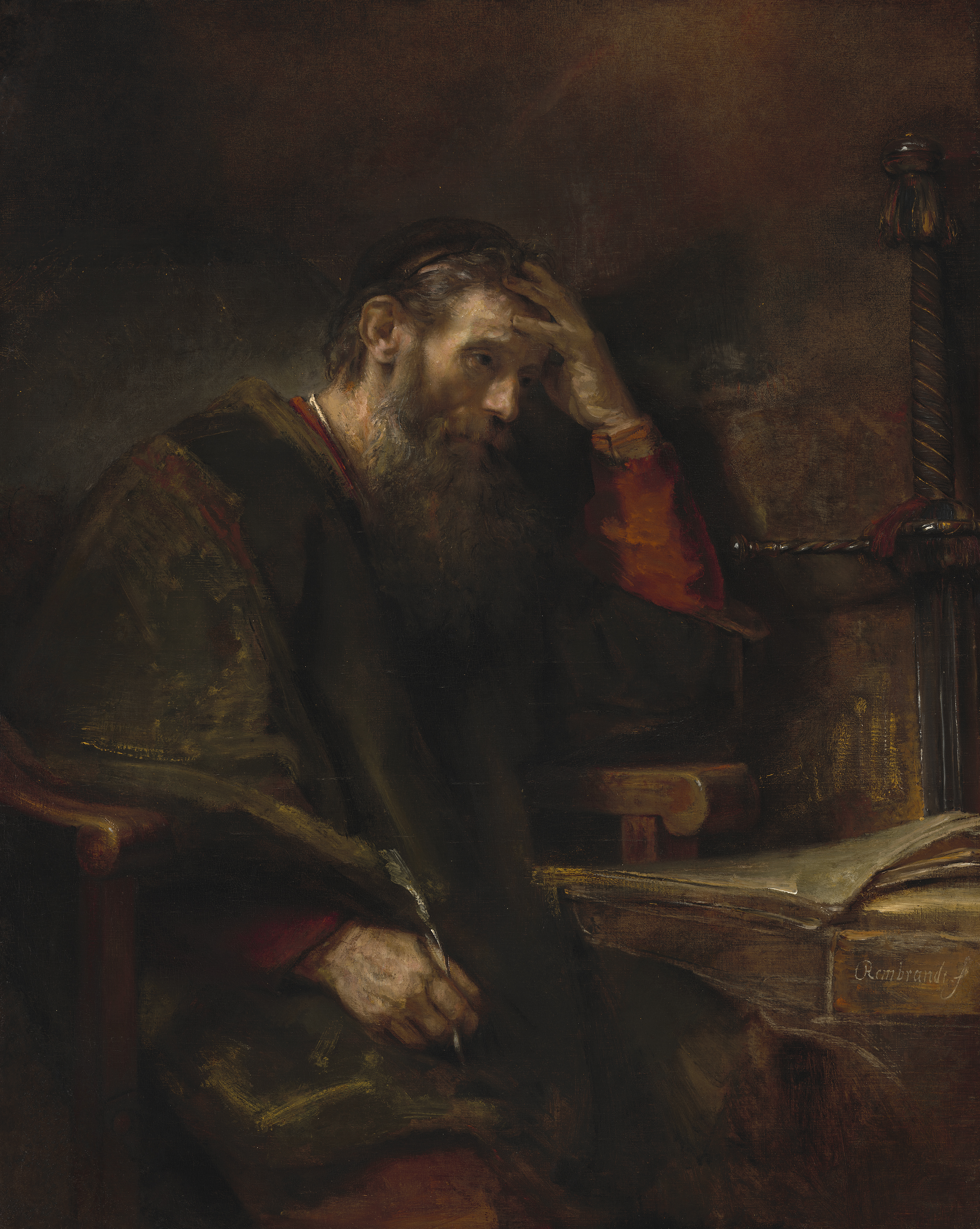
The Apostle Paul, by Rembrandt van Rijn, c. 1657

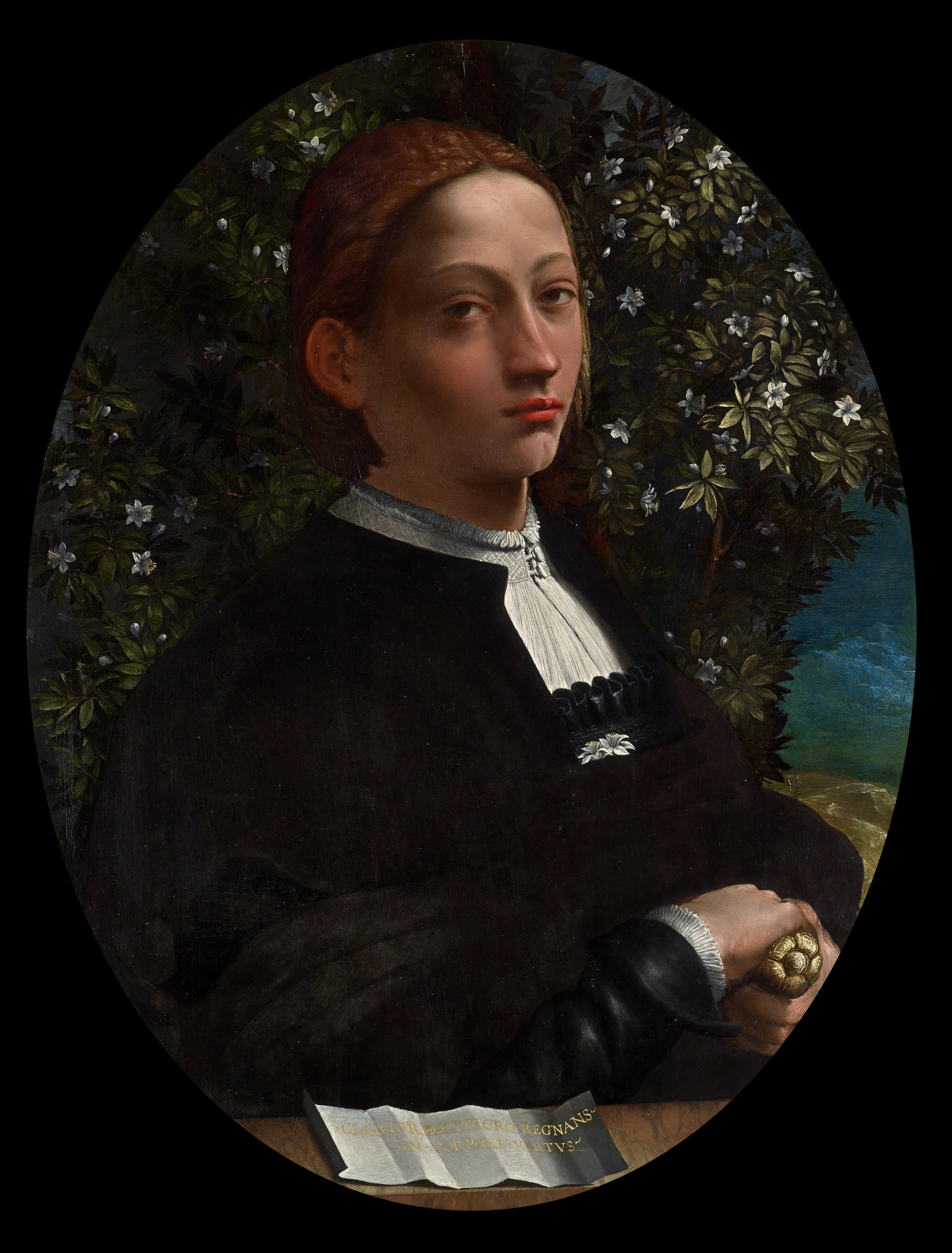
Lucrezia Borgia, Duchess of Ferrara, by Battista Dossi, c. 1519–1530

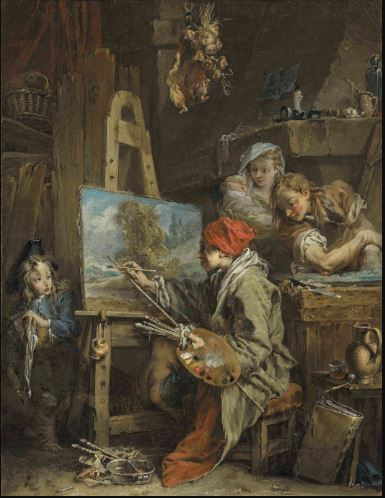
The Landscape Painter by François Boucher

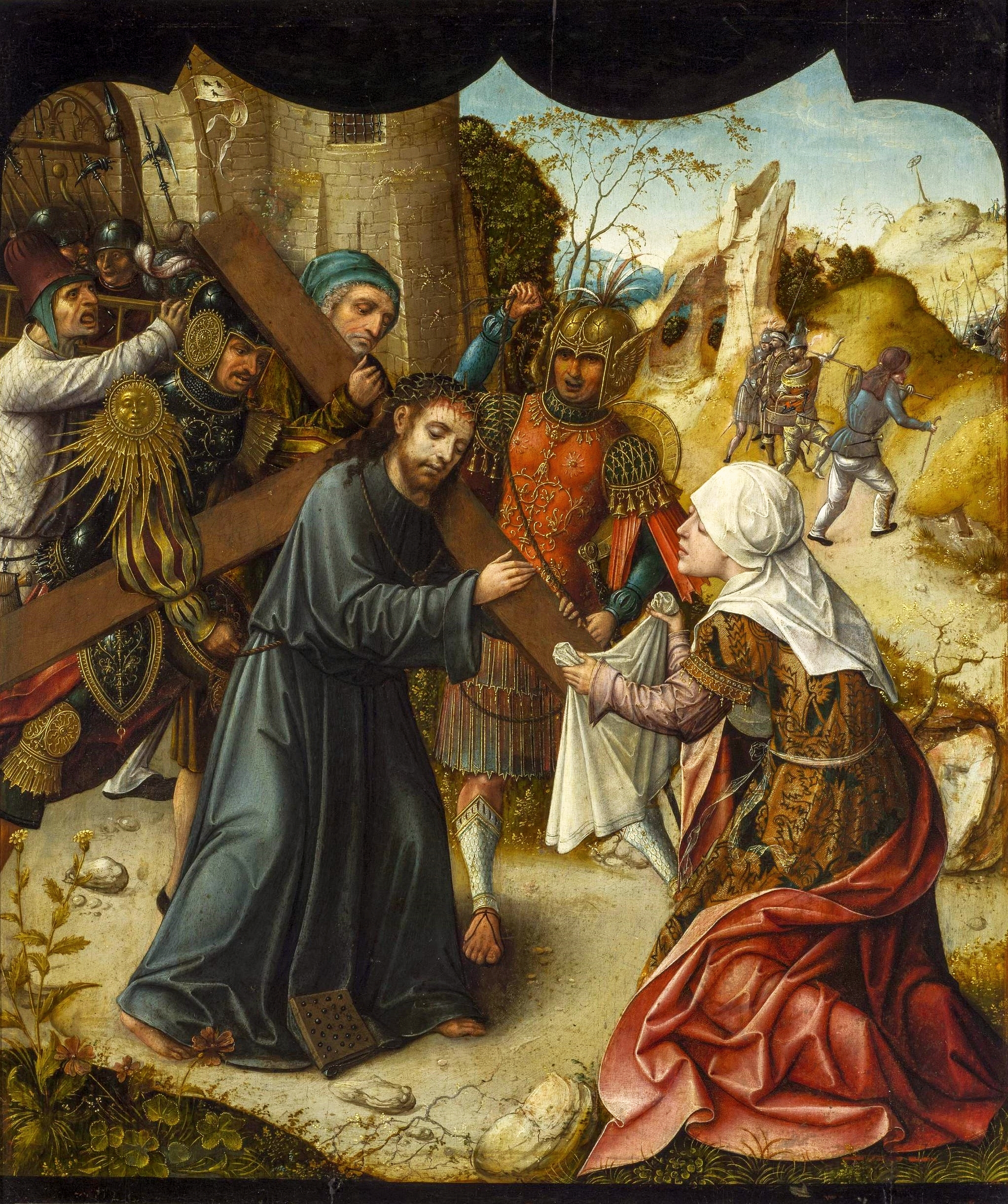
Bearing of the Cross with St. Veronica, by Lucas van Leyden, c. 1510s

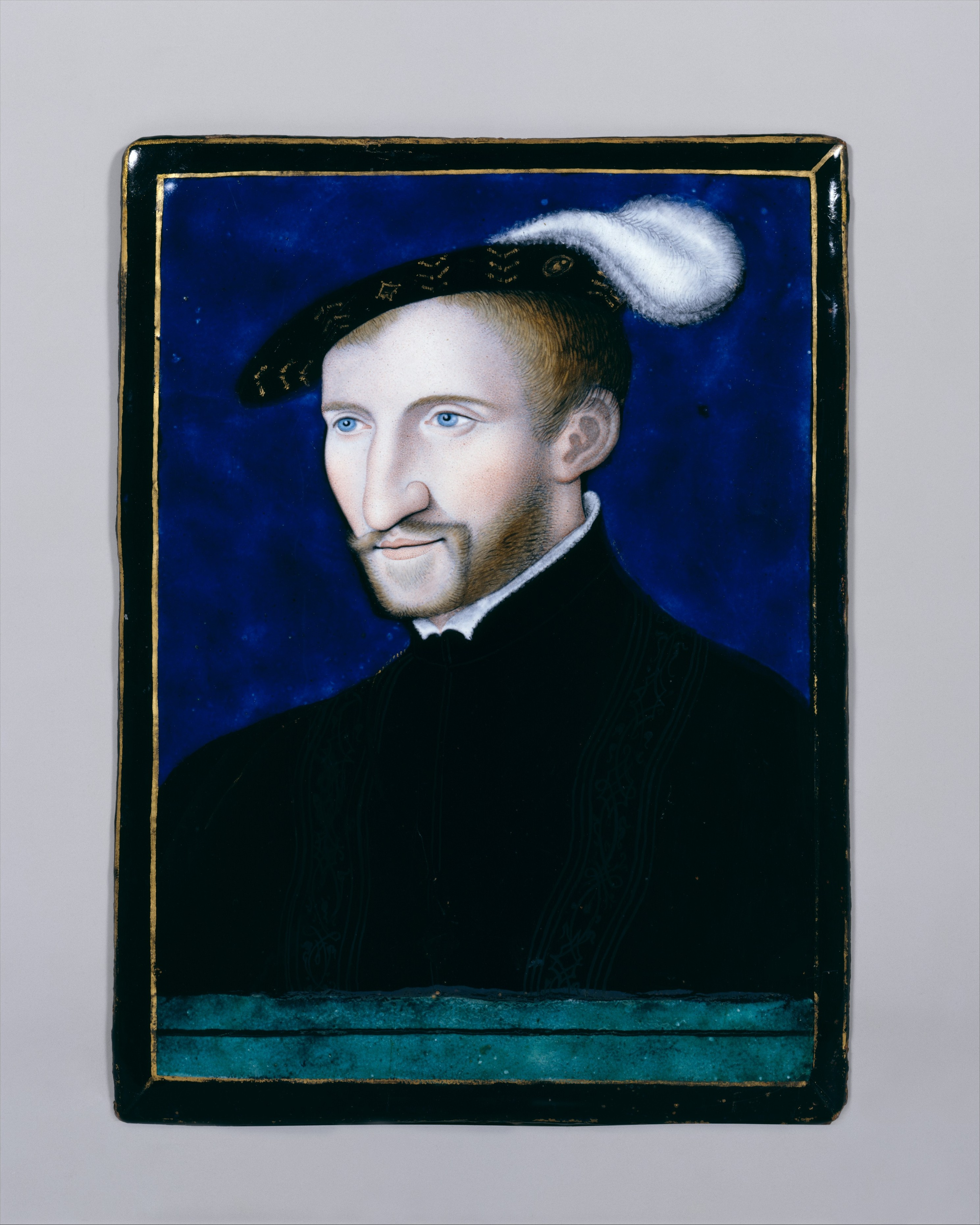
Henri d'Albret King of Navarre, by Léonard Limousin, 1556

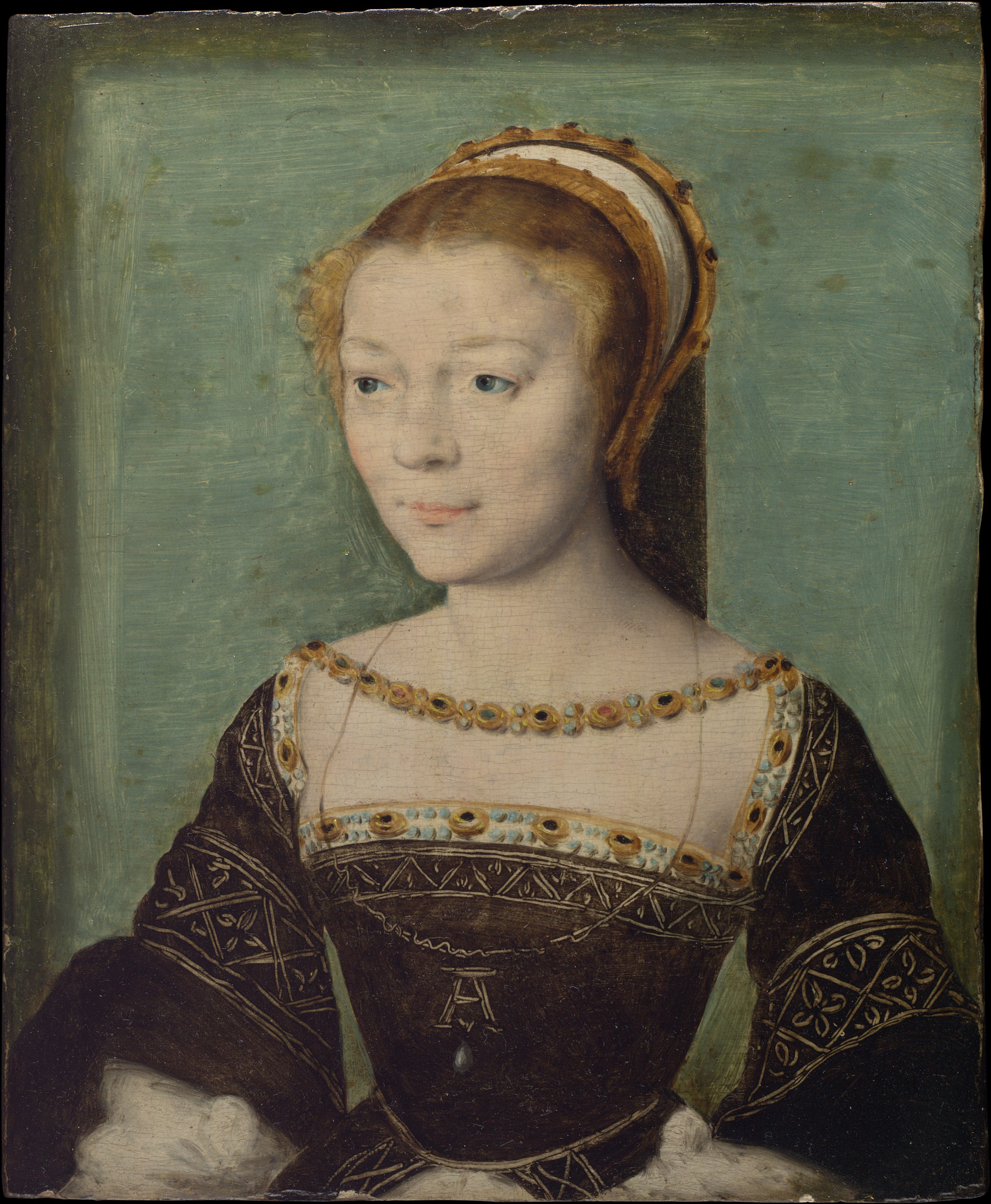
Anne de Pisseleu Duchesse d'Étampes, by Corneille de Lyon, c. 1535–40

Sculpture and pottery

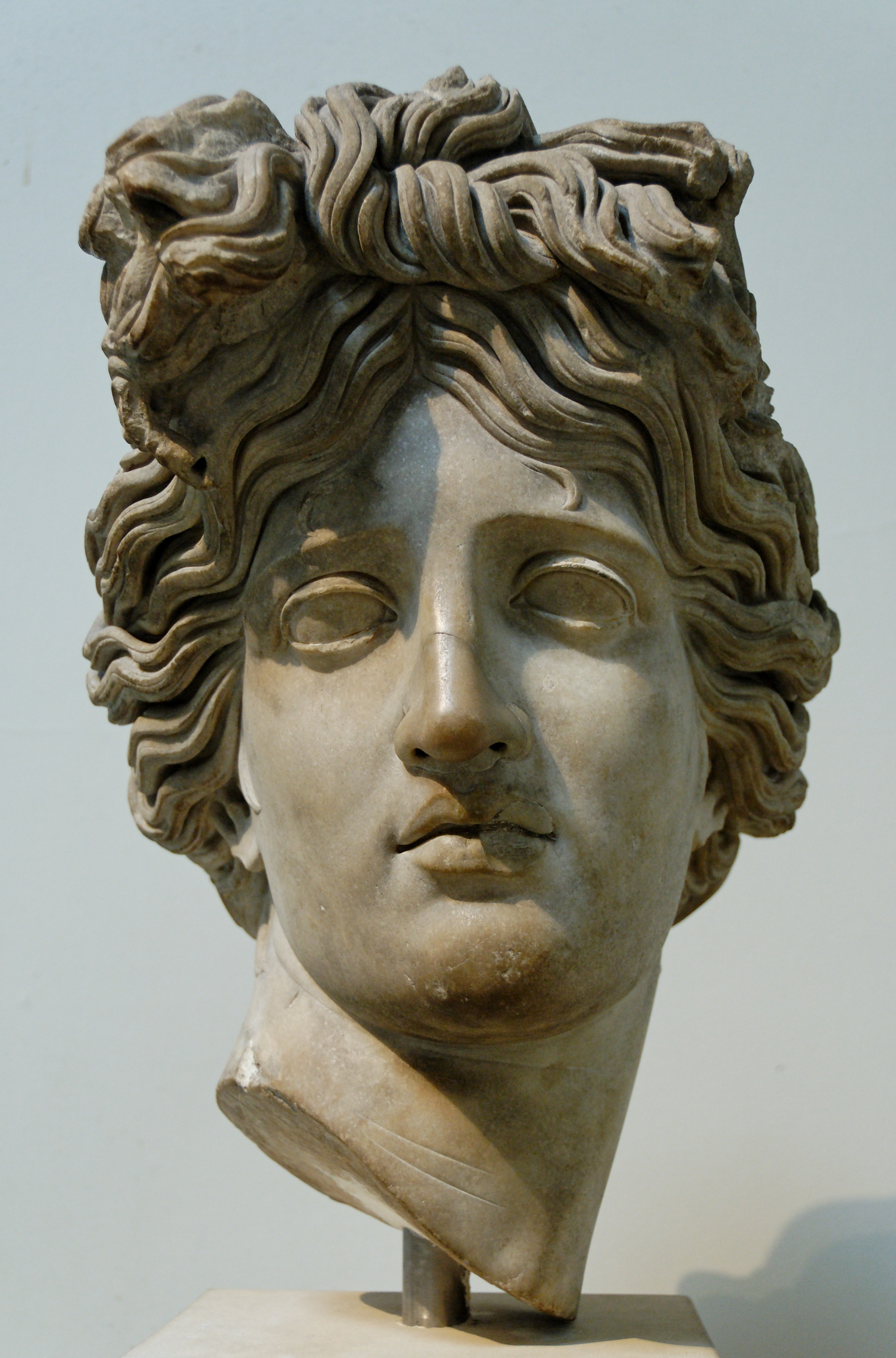
Head of Apollo, that was once in the collection of Vincenzo Giustiniani, Roman copy of c. 120–140

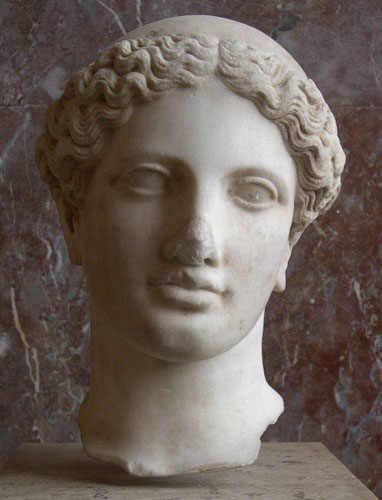
Head of the Borghese Hera

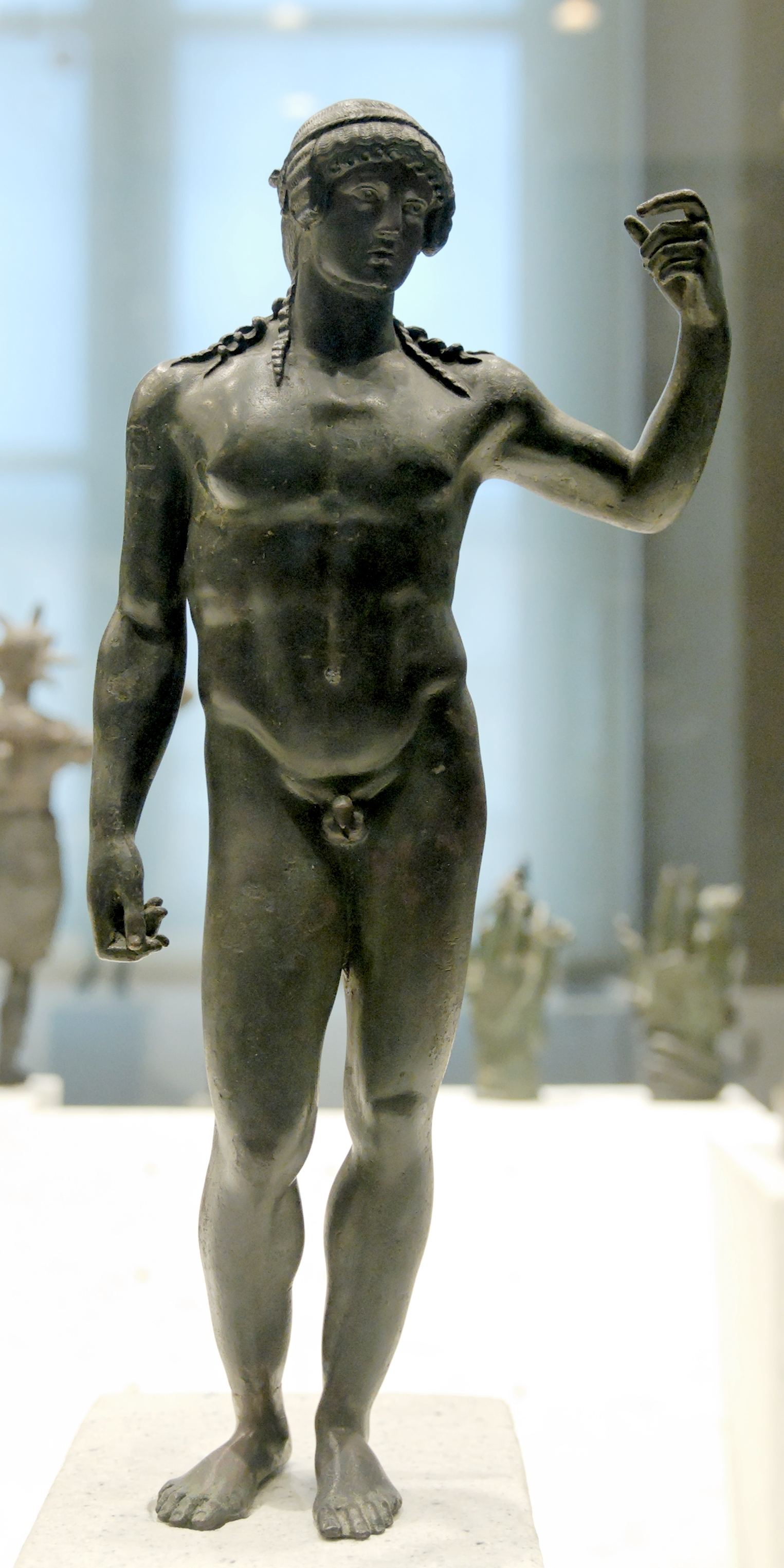
Apollo, holding his (lost) bow in the right hand and a (lost) laurel branch in the left hand

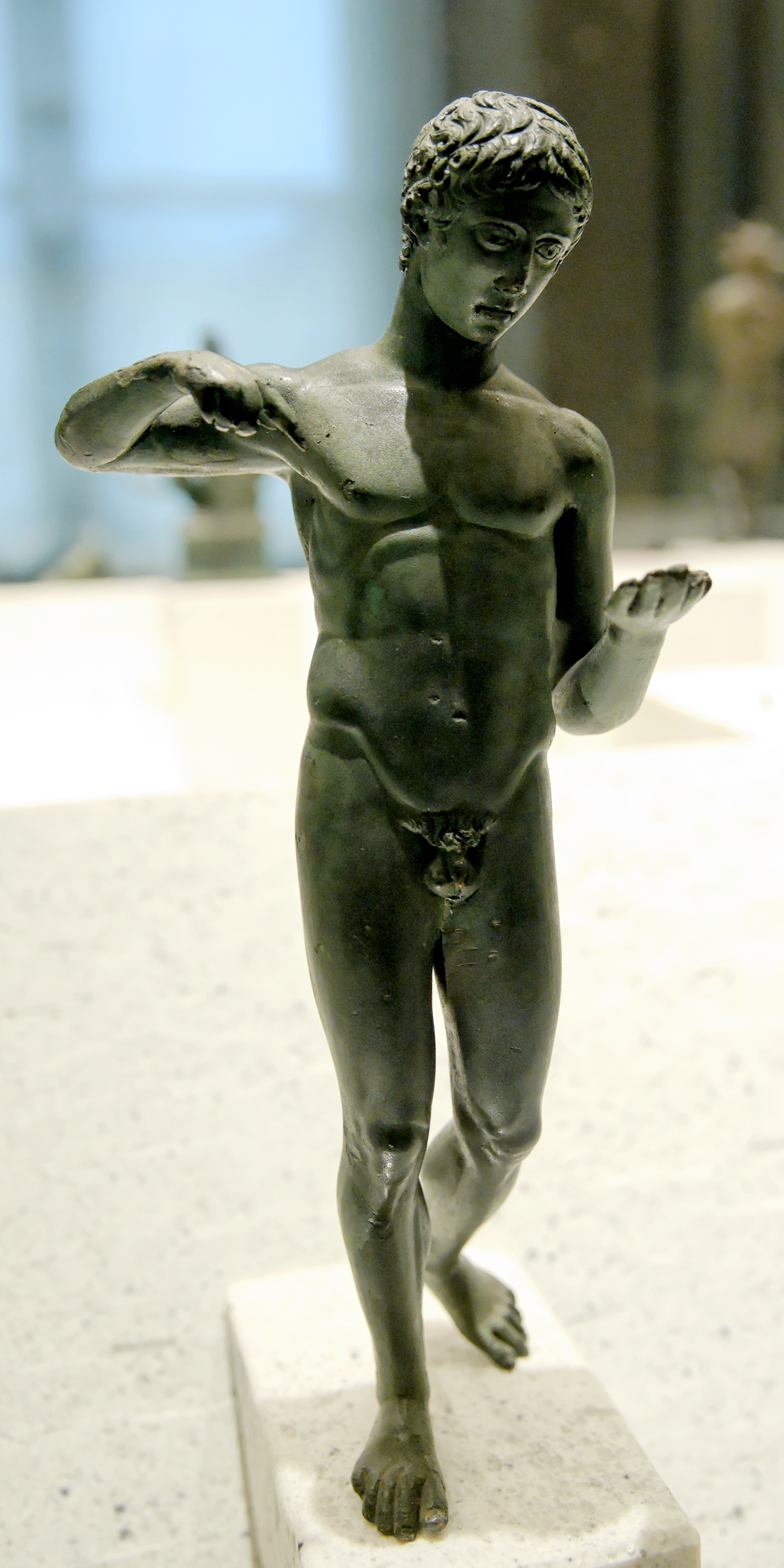
Mercury, holding a lost object, probably a tortoise, 1st century BC

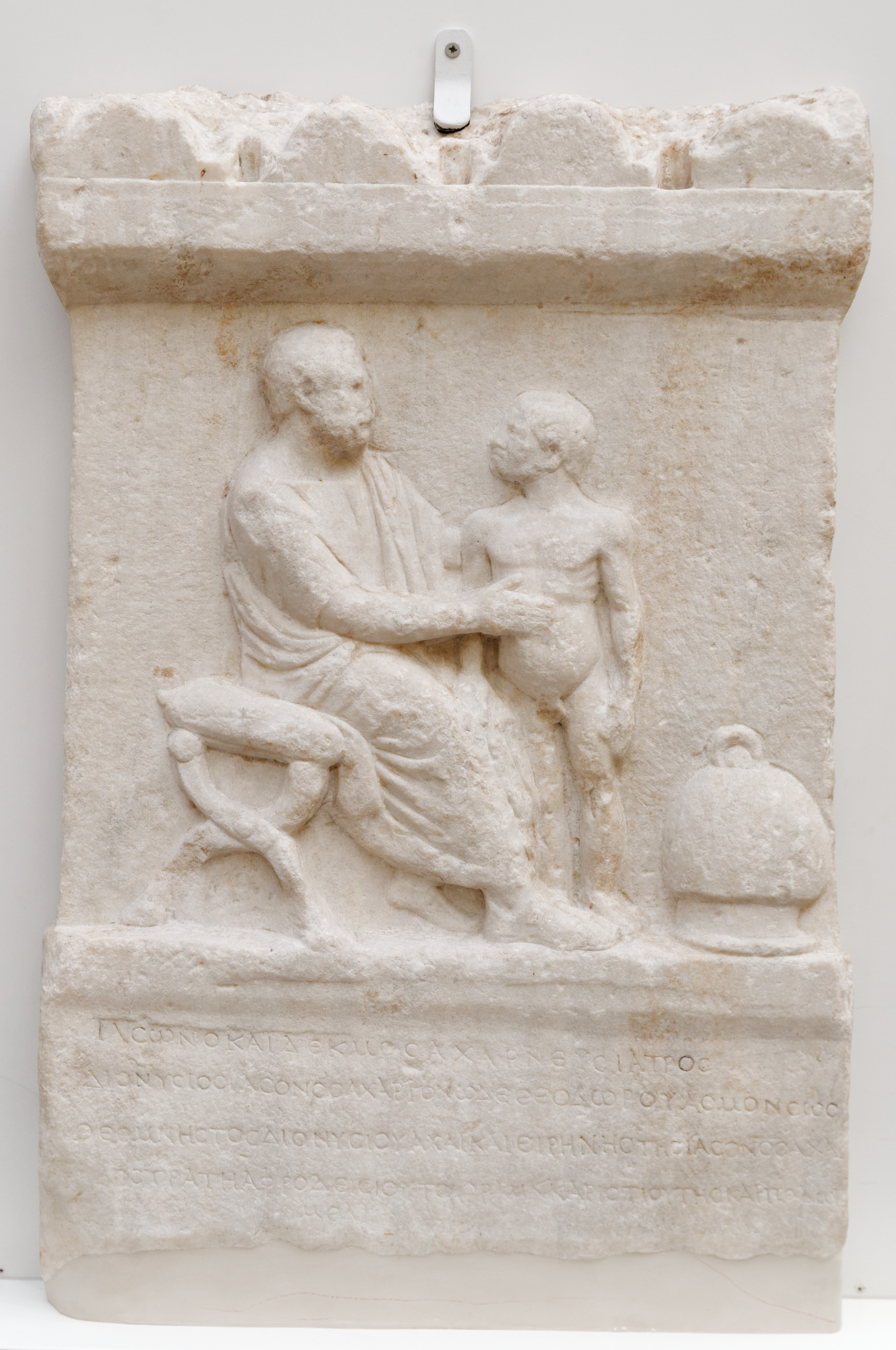
Funerary stele of Jason, c. 100 BC

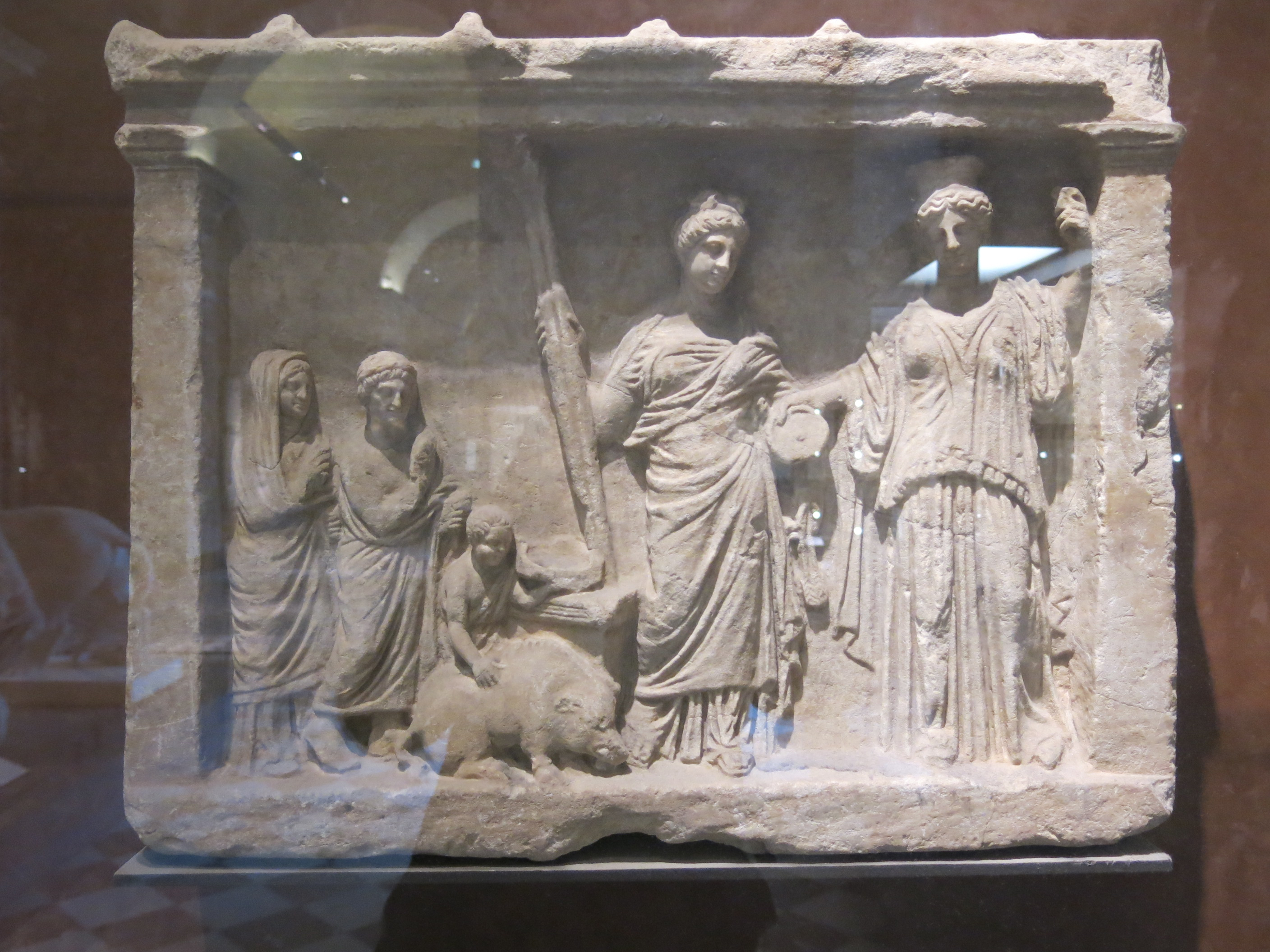
Sacrifice to Demeter (Ceres) and Core (Proserpine), c. 340–320 BC

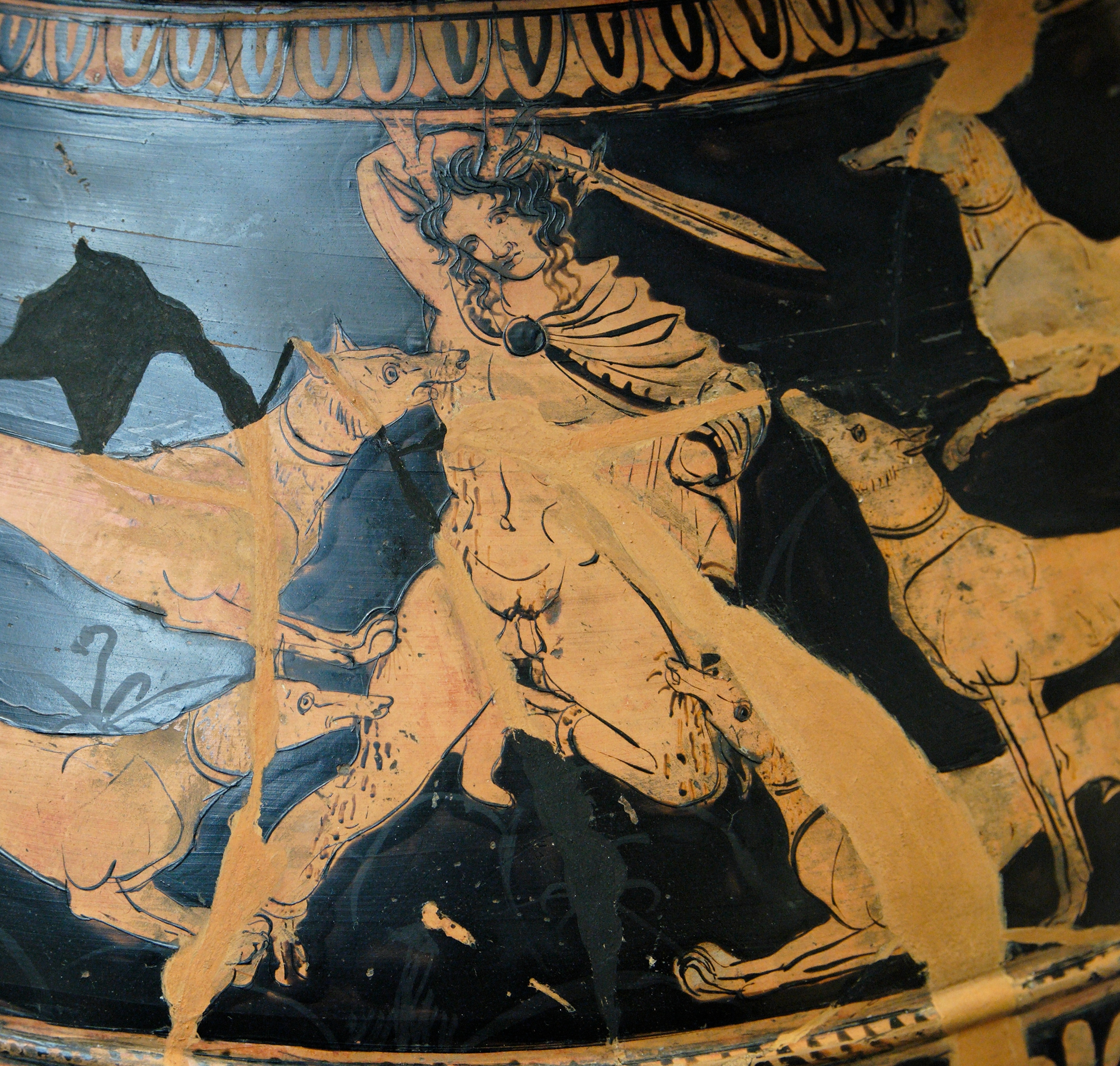
Actaeon attacked by his hounds by Dolon Painter

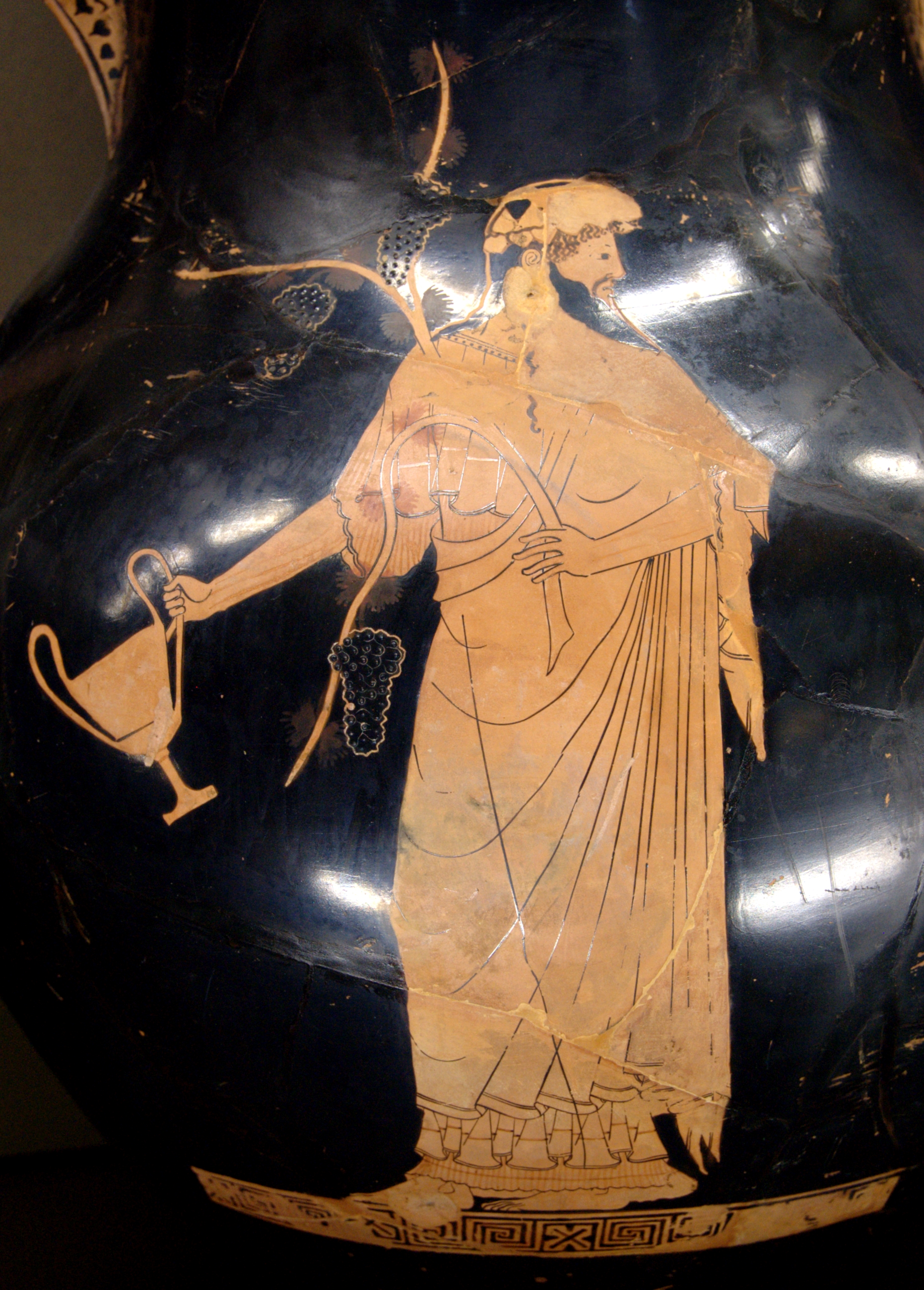
Dionysos holding a kantharos, c. 490–480 BC

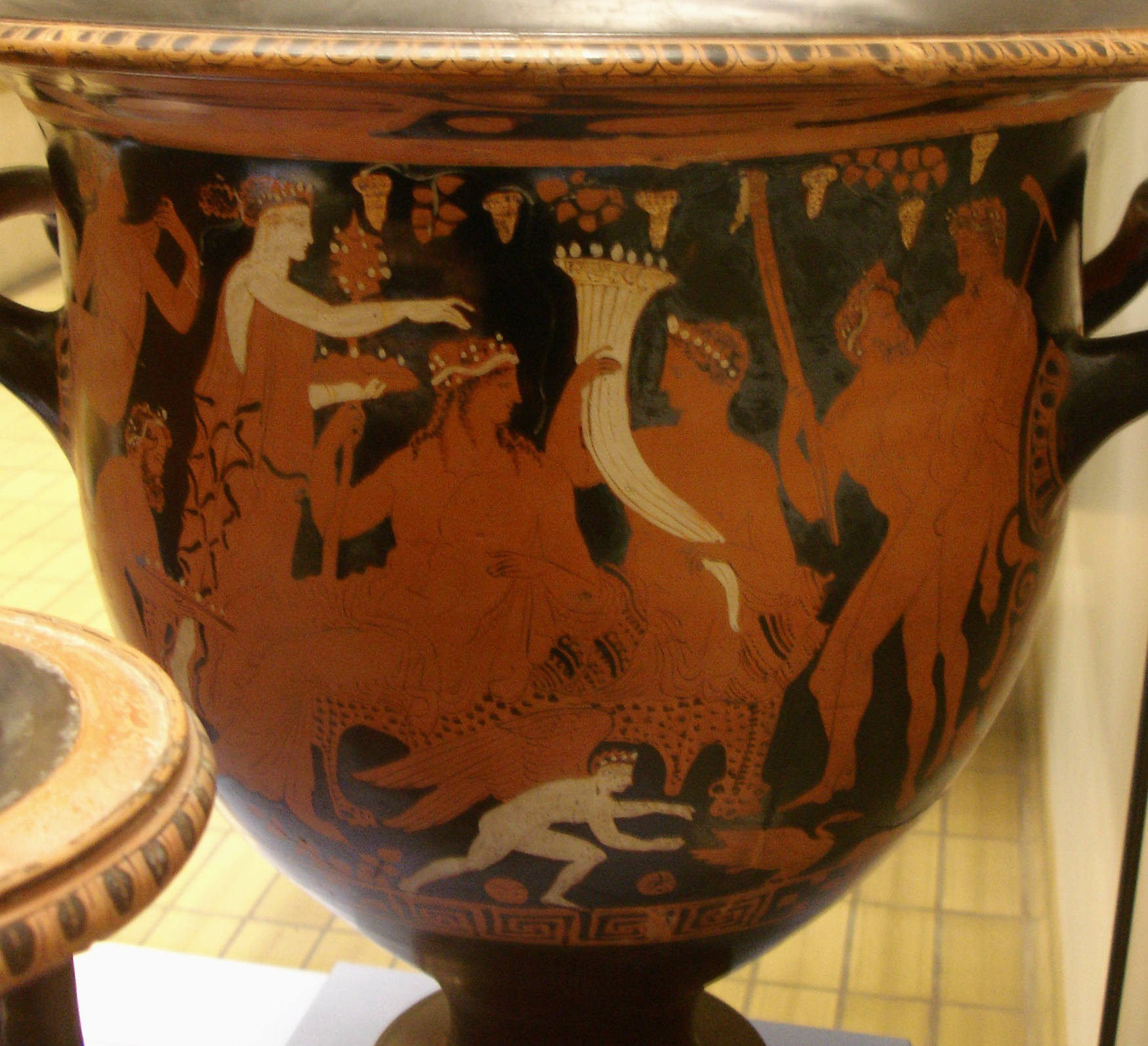
Dionysos and Ploutos surrounded by satyrs and maenads, c. 370–360 BC

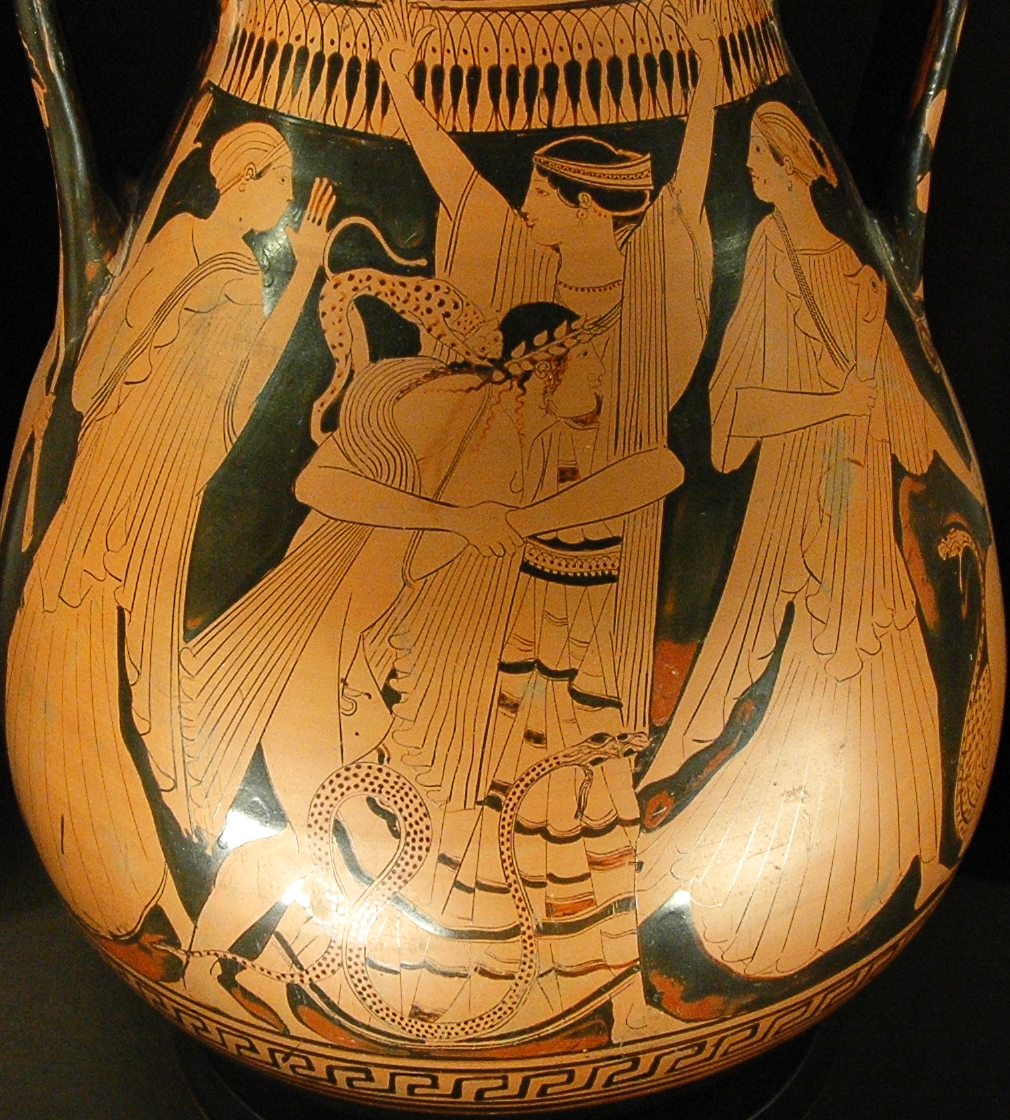
Peleus wrestling Thetis and holding her as she transforms into a snake, c. 460 BC

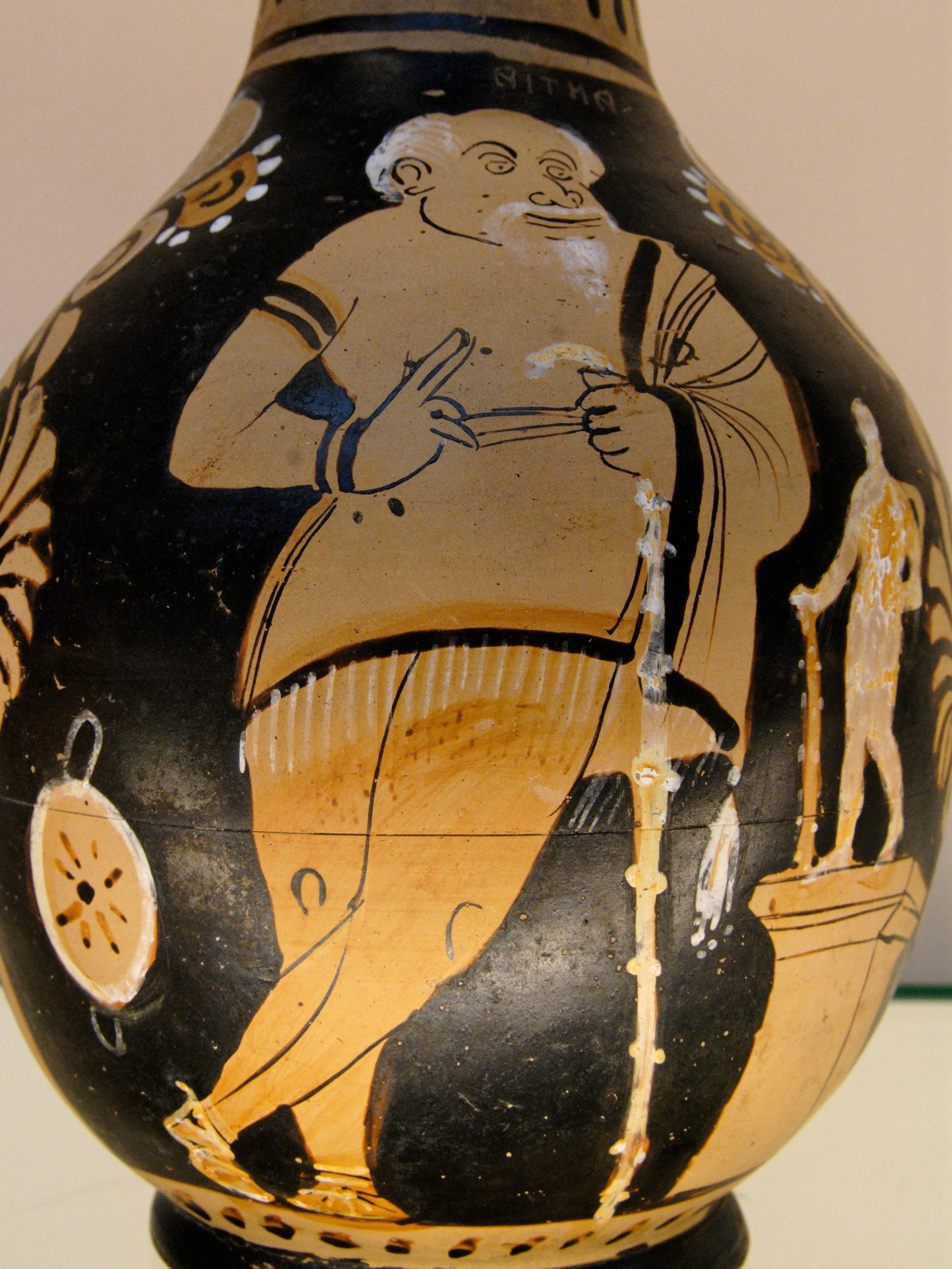
The actor Xanthias, standing next to a statuette of Heracles, c. 350–340 BC

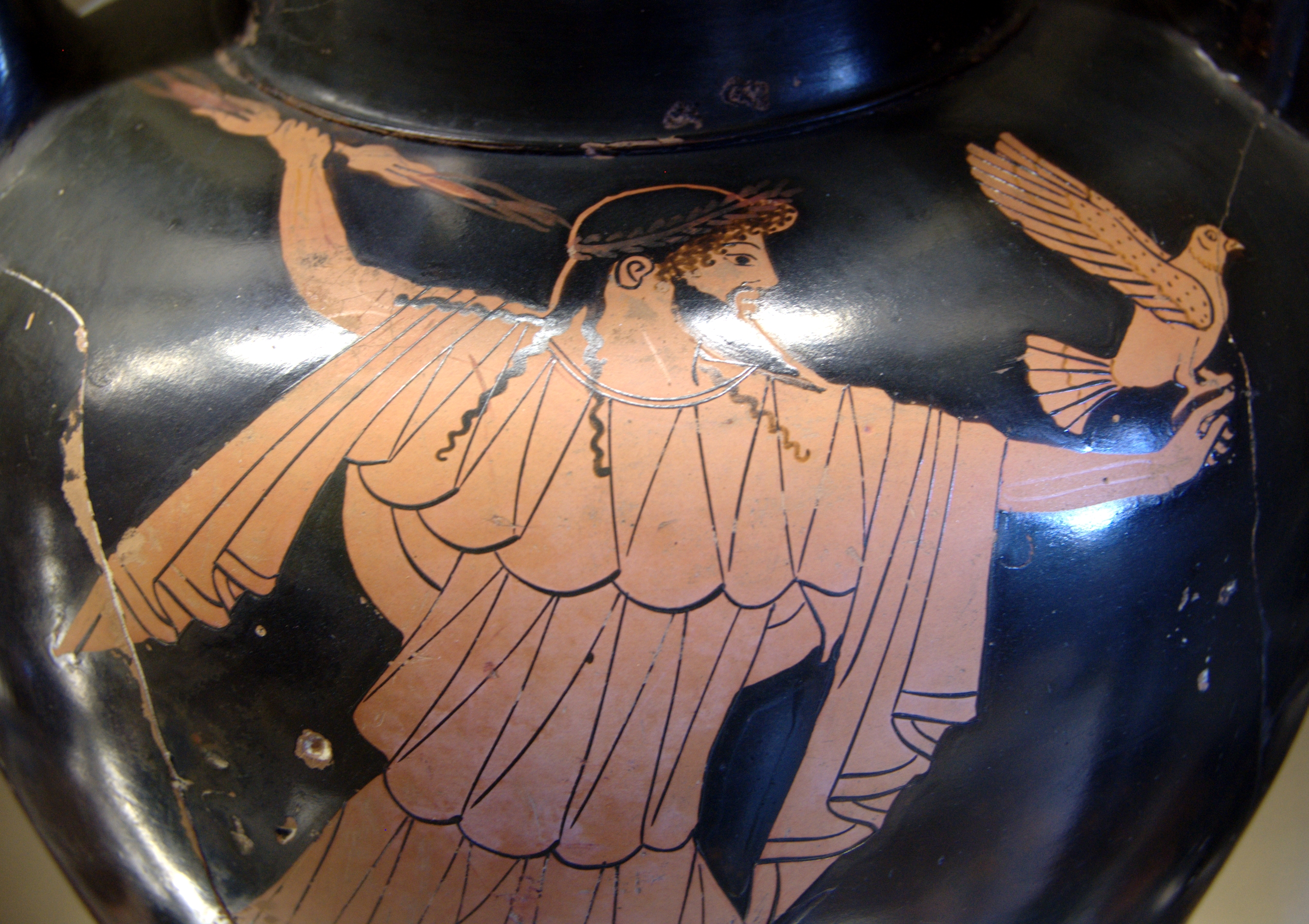
Zeus wielding the thunderbolt in his right hand, c. 480–470 BC

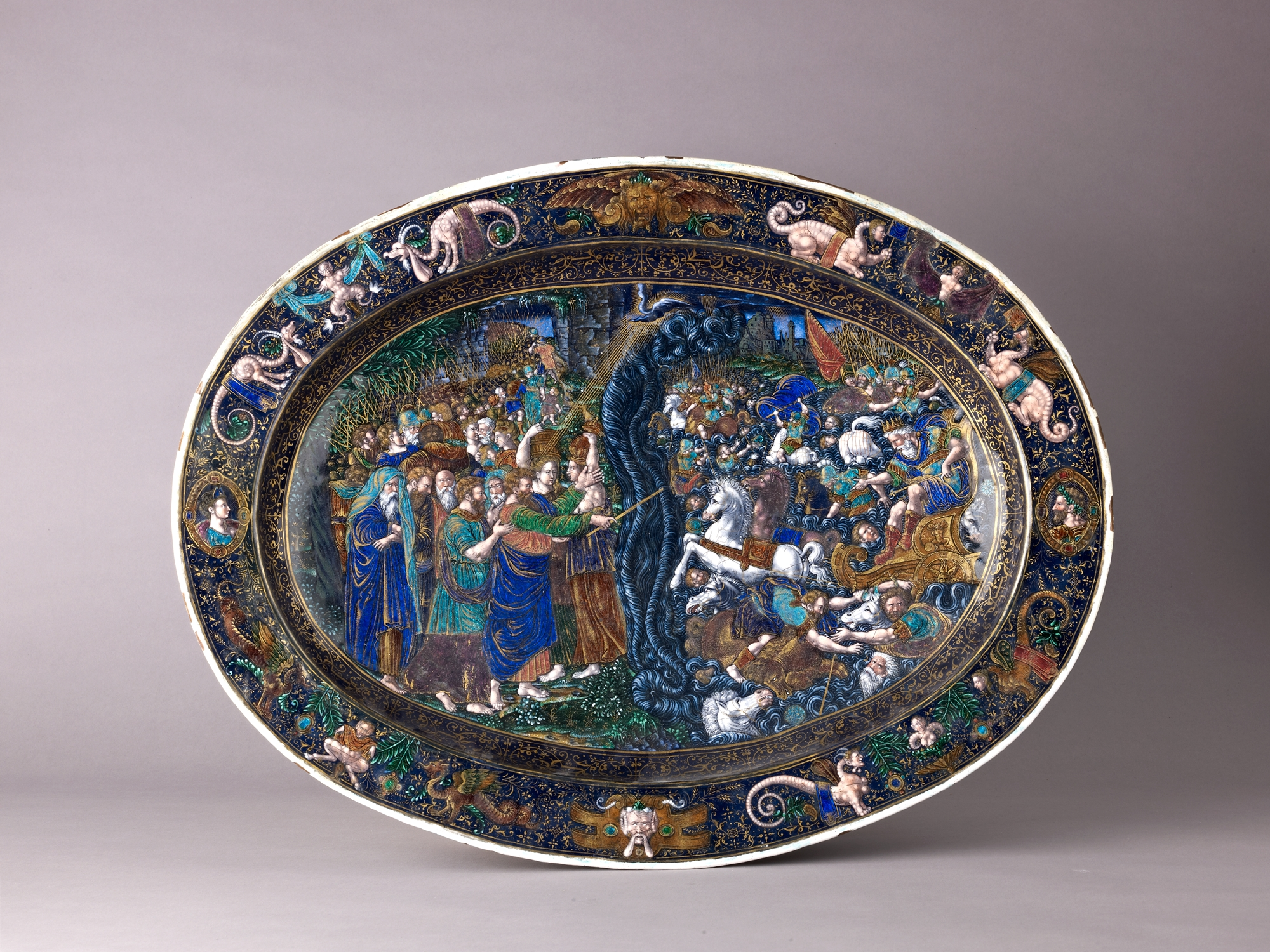
The Destruction of the Hosts of Pharaoh (front), by Jacques Courtois, early 17th century

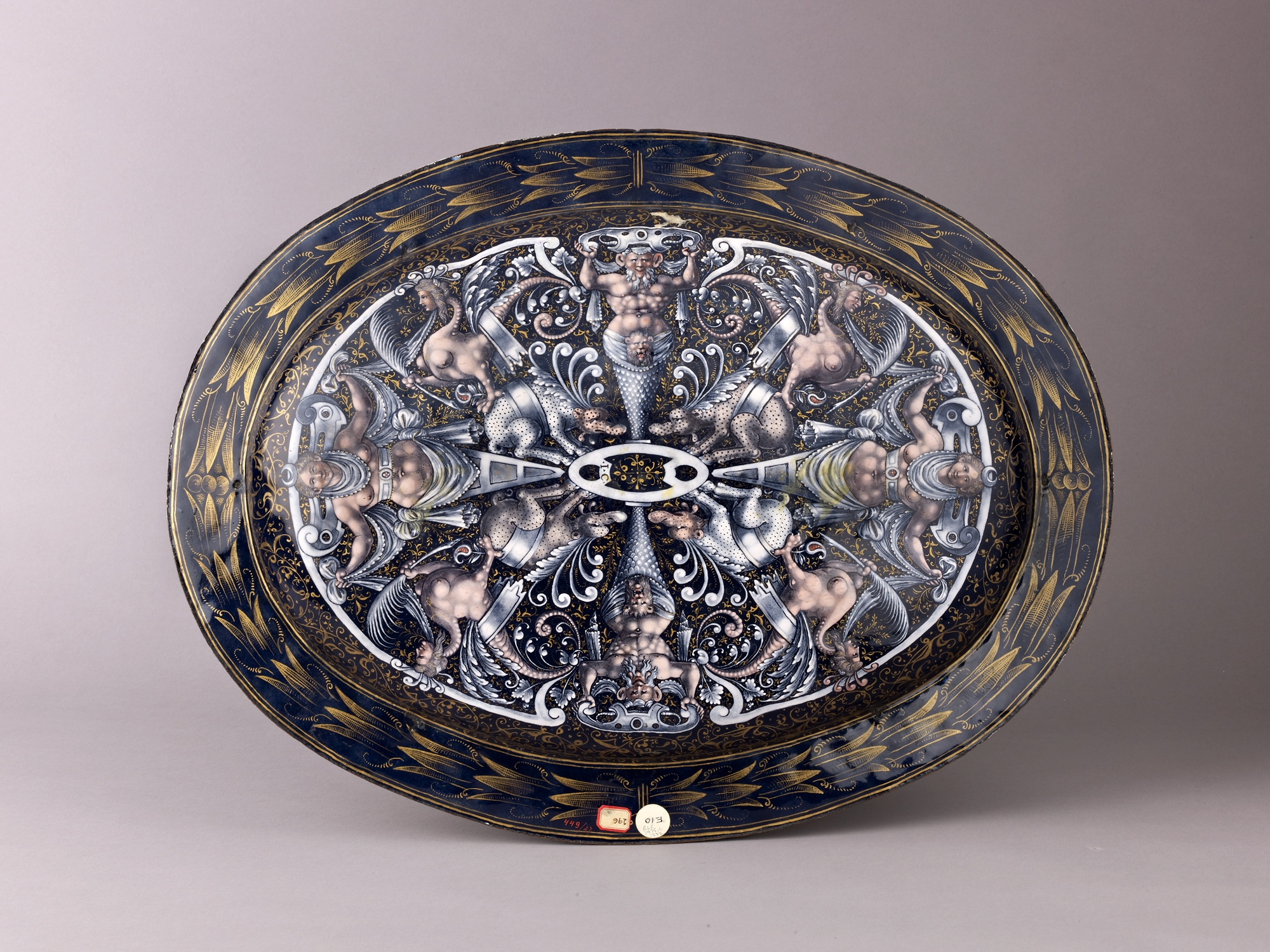
The Destruction of the Hosts of Pharaoh (back), by Jacques Courtois, early 17th century

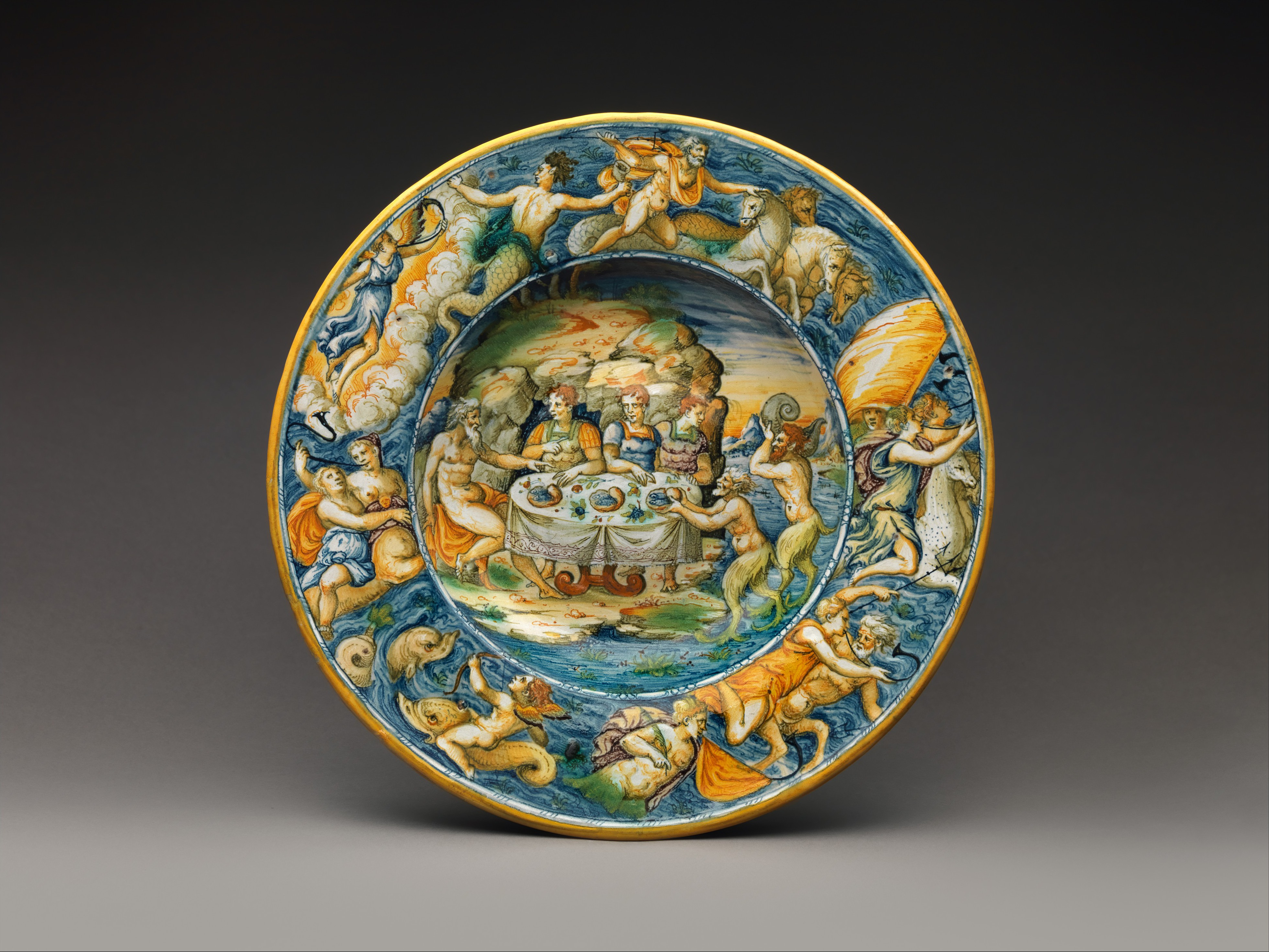
Dish with Achelous and Theseus, by Maestro Domenego da Venezia, c. 1550–70
