= Webb (surname) =

Origin
- Meaning: Weaver
- Region of origin: England, Scotland, Wales, Northern Ireland

Other names
- Variant forms: Weaver, Webbe, Webster, Webber, Webe

Webb is an Anglo-Saxon surname meaning weaver of cloth. Over time it diffused throughout the United Kingdom and Ireland, but it was initially confined to the south and centre of England.

== Notable people with the surname "Webb" include ==
=== A ===
- Adrian Webb (born 1943), British academic
- Aileen Osborn Webb (1892–1979), American aristocrat
- Ambrose Henry Webb (1882–1964), Irish judge
- Amy Webb (born 1974), American author
- Alan Webb (disambiguation), multiple people
- Alex Webb (disambiguation), multiple people
- Alexander Webb (disambiguation), multiple people
- Allan Webb (disambiguation), multiple people
- Allen Webb (born 1983), American football player
- Alli Webb, American entrepreneur
- Alliene Brandon Webb (1910–1965), American composer
- Alf Webb (1878–1932), English footballer
- Alfred Webb (1834–1908), Irish politician
- Alfreda Johnson Webb (1923–1992), American professor
- Alice Webb, British television executive
- Alicia Webb (born 1979), American professional wrestler
- Alison Webb (born 1961), Canadian judoka
- Alonzo C. Webb (1888–1975), American architect
- Ameer Webb (born 1991), American sprinter
- Anastasia Webb (born 1999), American artistic gymnast
- Anthony Webb (disambiguation), multiple people
- Archibald Webb (1866–1947), British painter
- Archie R. Webb (1881–1961), American football coach
- Art Webb (1893–1973), American football player
- Arthur Webb (1868–1952), English cricketer
- Arthur Webb (co-operator) (1868–1952), English co-operator
- Aston Webb (1849–1930), British architect
- Athol Webb (1935–2026), Australian rules footballer
- Austin Webb, American singer-songwriter

=== B ===
- Baby Webb, American baseball player
- Barbara Webb, Australian professor
- Barbara Womack Webb (born 1956/1957), American judge
- Barry Webb, Australian scholar
- Beatrice Webb (1858–1943), British activist
- Ben Webb (disambiguation), multiple people
- Benjamin Webb (disambiguation), multiple people
- Berry Webb (1915–1983), Australian cricketer
- Beth Webb, British author
- Betty Webb, American journalist
- Betty Webb (code breaker) (1923–2025), British code breaker
- Bianca Webb (born 2001), Australian rules footballer
- B. Linden Webb (1884–1968), Australian minister
- Bobby Webb (footballer) (1933–2023), English footballer
- Bobby Webb (tennis) (born 1953), American tennis player
- Boogie Bill Webb (1924–1990), American singer-songwriter
- Borlase Richmond Webb (1696–1738), British politician
- Boyd Webb (born 1947), New Zealand artist
- B. R. Webb (??–1860), American politician
- Braden Webb (born 1995), American baseball player
- Brad Webb, New Zealand sailor
- Bradley Webb (born 2001), English footballer
- Brandon Webb (born 1979), American baseball player
- Brandon Webb (author) (born 1974), American soldier
- Brenda Webb, Australian actress
- Brent Webb (born 1979), New Zealand rugby league footballer
- Brent W. Webb (born 1956), American professor
- Bresha Webb (born 1984), American actress
- Brian Webb (born 1945), English graphic designer
- Brian Webb (railway historian) (1935–1981), British historian
- Bronson Webb (born 1983), British actor
- Bruce Webb (1939–2020), Australian rules footballer
- Bruce Phillip Webb (1926–2000), 12th Chancellor of the University of Adelaide
- Bryan Webb (born 1977), Canadian singer-songwriter

=== C ===
- Cameron Webb (born 1982/1983), American physician
- Caroline Webb (born 1971), British author
- Carl "Charles" Webb formerly unidentified man known as "Somerton Man" (?)
- Carl Webb (1981–2023), Australian rugby league footballer
- Carl C. Webb (1901–1996), American journalist
- Cassandra Webb, Australian-American actress
- Cassell Webb, British-American musician
- Catherine Webb (born 1986), English author
- Catherine Webb (co-operative activist) (1859–1947), English activist
- Cathleen Mae Webb (1961–2008), American criminal figure
- Cecilia Webb (1888–1957), British sculptor
- Charles Webb (disambiguation), multiple people
- Charley Webb (born 1988), English actress
- Cheryl Webb (born 1976), Australian race walker
- Chick Webb (1909–1939), American musician
- Chloe Webb (born 1960), American actor
- Chris Webb (politician) (born 1986), British politician
- Chris Webb (sculptor), British sculptor
- Christopher Webb (1886–1966), English designer
- Christopher Webb (cricketer) (born 1950), New Zealand cricketer
- Chuck Webb (born 1969), American football player
- Clarence Hungerford Webb (1902–1999), American doctor
- Clay Webb (born 2000), American football player
- Clifford Webb (1894–1972), English artist
- Clifton Webb (disambiguation), multiple people
- Cloyd Webb (1942–1991), Canadian football player
- Cody Webb (born 1988), American motorcycle rider
- Colin Webb (cricketer) (1926–2015), Australian cricketer
- Colin Webb (historian) (1930–1992), South African historian
- Colin Webb (physicist) (born 1937), British physicist
- Cooper Webb (born 1995), American motocross racer
- Courtney Webb (born 1999), Australian cricketer

=== D ===
- D. A. Webb (1912–1994), Irish botanist
- Damon Webb (born 1995), American football player
- Daniel Webb (disambiguation), multiple people
- Darryl Webb (born 1988), American basketball player
- Darryn Webb, New Zealand air force officer
- David Webb (disambiguation), multiple people
- Davis Webb (born 1995), American football player
- Del Webb (1899–1974), American real estate developer
- Derek Webb (born 1974), American singer-songwriter
- Des Webb (1934–1987), New Zealand rugby union footballer
- DeWitt Webb (1840–1917), American physician
- Dick Webb (actor), British actor
- Donald Webb (disambiguation), multiple people
- Douglas Webb (1922–1996), British photographer
- Douglas Webb (police officer) (1909–1988), British police officer
- Doyle Webb (born 1955), American politician
- Duncan Webb (born 1967), New Zealand politician
- Dunstan Webb, Australian actor

=== E ===
- Earl Webb (1897–1965), American baseball player
- Edmund Webb (disambiguation), multiple people
  - Edmund Webb (Australian politician) (1830–1899), Australian politician
  - Edmund Webb (MP) (1639–1705), English politician
  - Edmund F. Webb (1835–1898), American politician
- Edward Webb (disambiguation), multiple people
- Edwin Webb (disambiguation), multiple people
- Electra Havemeyer Webb (1888–1960), American art collector
- Ella Webb (1877–1946), Irish paediatrician
- Eliza Osgood Vanderbilt Webb (1860–1936), American socialite
- Elliott Webb (born 1971), English radio presenter
- Ellsworth Webb (1931–2017), American boxer
- Eloise Webb (born 1996), South African rugby sevens footballer
- Elven Webb (1910–1979), British art director
- Erasmus Webb (??–1614), English priest
- Ercel F. Webb (1920–1999), American clergyman
- Eric Webb (1889–1984), New Zealand engineer
- Ernest Webb (1874–1937), British athlete

=== F ===
- Francis Webb (disambiguation), multiple people
- Frank Elbridge Webb (1869–1949), American engineer and presidential candidate in 1928 and 1932
- Frank Webb (disambiguation), multiple people
- Fred Webb (1853–1917), British jockey
- Freddie Webb (born 1942), Filipino basketball player

=== G ===
- Garth Webb (1918–2012), Canadian soldier
- Gary Webb (disambiguation), multiple people
- Geoffrey Webb (disambiguation), multiple people
- George Webb (disambiguation), multiple people
- Gerald Bertram Webb (1871–1948), English-American physician
- Gillian Webb (born 1956), British rower
- Gisela Webb, American religious scholar
- Glenn F. Webb, American mathematician
- Godfrey Webb (1914–2003), British author
- Graham Webb (1944–2017), British racing cyclist
- Graham Webb (broadcaster) (1936–2024), Australian television presenter
- Grant Webb (born 1979), New Zealand rugby union footballer
- Gregory Webb (born 1950), American police officer

=== H ===
- Haley Webb (born 1985), American actress and filmmaker
- Hank Webb (born 1950), American baseball player
- Harold Webb (1909–1989), American physicist
- Harri Webb (1920–1994), Welsh poet
- Harry Webb (disambiguation), multiple people
- Henry Webb (disambiguation), multiple people
- Herbert Webb (1913–1947), English cricketer
- Holly Webb (born 1976), British writer
- Howard Webb (born 1971), English football referee
- Hubert Webb (born 1968), American criminal
- Hubert Webb (cricketer) (1927–2010), English cricketer
- H. Walter Webb (1856–1900) American railway executive

=== I ===
- Iain Webb (born 1959), English ballet dancer
- Iain R. Webb, British writer
- Ike Webb (1874–1950), English footballer
- Isaac Webb (shipbuilder) (1794–1840), American shipbuilder

=== J ===
- Jack Webb (1920–1982), American actor
- Jack Webb (novelist) (1916–2008), American novelist
- Jackie Webb (footballer) (born 1943), Scottish footballer
- Jaco Webb, South African rugby league footballer
- Jacob Webb (born 1993), American baseball player
- James Webb (disambiguation), multiple people
- Jamie Webb (born 1994), British athlete
- Jane Webb (1925–2010), American actress
- Jane Webb (Northampton, Virginia), American indentured servant
- Janeen Webb (born 1951), Australian writer
- Janet Webb (1930–1983), English actress
- Jason Webb (born 1973), Filipino basketball coach
- Jay Lee Webb (1937–1996), American singer
- J. B. Webb (1929–2009), Australian activist
- Jeff Webb (disambiguation), multiple people
- Jennifer Webb (born 1979), American politician
- Jennifer M. Webb (born 1953), Australian archaeologist
- Jeremiah Webb (born 2001), American football player
- Jesse L. Webb Jr. (1923–1956), American politician
- Jessica L. Webb, Canadian writer
- Jessie Webb (1880–1944), Australian academic
- J. Griswold Webb (1890–1934), American politician
- Jim Webb (disambiguation), multiple people
- Jimmy Webb (disambiguation), multiple people
- J'Marcus Webb (born 1988), American football player
- Joe Webb (born 1986), American football player
- Joe Webb (horse trainer) (born 1928), American horse trainer
- John Webb (disambiguation), multiple people
- Jonathan Webb (born 1963), English rugby union footballer
- Jonathan Webb (footballer) (born 1990), English footballer
- Jonathon Webb (born 1983), Australian auto racing driver
- Jonathon Webb (cricketer) (born 1992), English cricketer
- Jordan Webb (born 1988), Canadian soccer player
- Joseph Webb (1908–1962), British painter
- Josephine Webb (1918–2017), American electrical engineer
- Josh Webb (footballer) (born 1995), English footballer
- Judith Webb, British soldier
- Judy Webb, English ecologist
- Julian Webb (1911–2002), American politician
- June Webb (born 1934), American singer-songwriter
- Justin Webb (born 1961), British journalist

=== K ===
- Karen Webb, Australian police officer
- Karim Webb (born 1974), American restaurateur
- Karrie Webb (born 1974), Australian golfer
- Kate Webb (1943–2007), Australian journalist
- Katharine Webb (disambiguation), multiple people
- Katherine Webb (born 1989), American model
- Kathleen Webb (born 1956), American comic book writer
- Kathy Webb (born 1949), American politician
- Katrina Webb (born 1977), Australian Paralympic athlete
- Kaye Webb (1914–1996), British editor
- Keith Webb (1933–2021), Australian rules footballer
- Kenneth Webb (disambiguation), multiple people
- Kevin Webb (disambiguation), multiple people
- Kevyn Webb (1924–1990), Australian rower
- Kristina Webb, New Zealand artist, illustrator and cartoonist

=== L ===
- La'Damian Webb (born 1999), American football player
- Lahilahi Webb (1862–1949), Hawaiian royal
- Lardarius Webb (born 1985), American football player
- Lardarius Webb Jr. (born 2003), American football player
- Laurie Webb (1924–2026), Welsh actor
- Lawrence Webb, American politician
- Lea Webb, American politician
- Lee Webb (born 1981), American football player
- Lefty Webb (1885–1958), American baseball player
- Leland Justin Webb (1846–1893), American politician and lawyer
- Leonard Webb (disambiguation), multiple people
- Lindsay Webb (born 1973), Australian comedian
- Lisa Webb (born 1984), Australian rules footballer
- Lizbeth Webb (1926–2013), English actress
- Lizzie Webb (born 1948), British fitness expert
- Logan Webb (born 1996), American baseball player
- Lon Webb, American baseball player
- Lorna Webb (born 1983), English cyclist
- Lou Webb (1911–1940), American racing driver
- Lucy Webb, American actress
- Lukas Webb (born 1996), Australian rules footballer
- Luke Webb (born 1986), English footballer
- Luke Webb (cricketer) (born 1995), English cricketer
- Lydia Webb (1736–1793), English actress

=== M ===
- Mal Webb (born 1966), Australian singer
- Marc Webb (born 1974), American filmmaker
- Marc Webb (footballer) (born 1979), Australian rules footballer
- Marcus Webb (born 1970), American basketball player
- Margaret Ely Webb (1877–1965), American illustrator
- Margot Webb (1910–2005), American dancer
- Maria Webb (1804–1873), Irish philanthropist
- Marilyn Salzman Webb (born 1942), American author
- Marilynn Webb (1937–2021), New Zealand artist
- Marissa Webb, American fashion designer
- Mark Webb (disambiguation), multiple people
- Marshall B. Webb (born 1961), American general
- Martell Webb (born 1989), American football player
- Marti Webb (born 1944), English actress
- Martin Webb (born 1964), British entrepreneur
- Martyn Webb (1925–2016), Australian professor
- Mary Webb (disambiguation), multiple people
- Mason Webb (born 1986), American soccer player
- Matthew Webb (1848–1883), British swimmer
- Matthew Webb (footballer) (born 1976), English footballer
- Maurice Webb (disambiguation), multiple people
- Max Webb (1917–2018), Polish-American real estate developer
- Maynard Webb (born 1955), American entrepreneur
- Maysie Webb (1923–2005), British librarian
- Merryn Somerset Webb (born 1970), English editor
- Michael Webb (disambiguation), multiple people
- Millard Webb (1893–1935), American screenwriter
- Mimi Webb (born 2000), British singer-songwriter
- Mojo Webb, American musician
- Morgan Webb (born 1978), American television host
- M. Price Webb (1862–1938), American politician
- Murray Webb (born 1947), New Zealand artist

=== N ===
- Nathan Webb (disambiguation), multiple people
- Nathaniel Webb (disambiguation), multiple people
- Neil Webb (born 1963), British footballer
- Nick Webb (disambiguation), multiple people
- Noel Webb (disambiguation), multiple people
- Norm Webb (1921–1996), Australian rules footballer
- Norris Webb (born 1945), Panamanian basketball player

=== O ===
- Olive Webb, New Zealand clinical psychologist
- Oliver Webb (born 1991), British auto racing driver

=== P ===
- Paddy Webb (1884–1950), New Zealand unionist and politician
- Patricia Ann Webb (1925–2005), English microbiologist
- Patrick Webb (disambiguation), multiple people
- Paul Webb (disambiguation), multiple people
- Pauline Webb (1927–2017), English ecumenist, author, and broadcaster
- Peggy Webb (writer) (born 1942), American author
- Peggy Webb (politician), American politician
- Peter Webb (disambiguation), multiple people
- Philip Webb (1831–1915), British architect
- Philip Carteret Webb (1702–1770), English barrister
- Phyllis Webb (1927–2021), Canadian poet
- Pinky Webb (born 1970), Filipino journalist

=== R ===
- Raleigh Webb (born 1997), American football player
- Ralph Webb (1887–1945), Canadian politician
- Ralph Webb (American football) (born 1994), American football player
- R. Curt Webb (born 1949), American politician
- Rebecca Norris Webb (born 1956), American photographer
- Red Webb (1924–1996), American baseball player
- Reg Webb (1947–2018), English musician
- Regina Webb (born 1980), American author
- Reynolds Webb (1900–1989), Australian rules footballer
- Rhys Webb (born 1988), Welsh rugby union footballer
- Richard Webb (disambiguation), multiple people
- Richie Webb, British comedy writer
- Richmond Webb (born 1967), American football player
- Rita Webb (1904–1981), English actress
- R. J. Webb (born 1987), American football player
- Robb Webb (1939–2021), American voice artist
- Robert Webb (disambiguation), multiple people
- Robin Webb (born 1945), English animal rights activist
- Robin L. Webb (born 1960), American politician
- Rod Webb (1910–1999), Canadian politician
- Rodney Webb (born 1943), English rugby union footballer
- Rodney Scott Webb (1935–2009), American judge
- Roger Webb (1934–2002), British jazz pianist and composer
- Roger Webb (politician), American politician
- Roy Webb (1888–1982), American film composer
- Rupert Webb (1922–2018), English cricketer
- Russell Webb (disambiguation), multiple people
- Ryan Webb (born 1986), American baseball player

=== S ===
- Sam Webb (disambiguation), multiple people
- Sarah Webb (disambiguation), multiple people
- Seán Webb (born 1983), Northern Irish footballer
- Shane Webb (born 1980), Australian footballer
- Sharni Webb (born 1991), Australian rules footballer
- Sharon Webb (1936–2010), American author
- Shaun Webb (born 1981), New Zealand-Japanese rugby union footballer
- Shelley Webb, British television presenter
- Shirley Webb (born 1981), British hammer thrower
- Sid Webb (1884–1956), English footballer
- Sidney Webb (1859–1947), British activist
- Sidney Webb (cricketer) (1875–1923), English cricketer
- Simon Webb (disambiguation), multiple people
- Skeeter Webb (1909–1986), American baseball player
- Suhaib Webb (born 1972), American religious figure
- Spencer Webb (2000–2022), American football player
- Sheyann Webb (born 1956), American activist
- Speed Webb (1906–1994), American jazz drummer
- Spider Webb (disambiguation), multiple people
- Spud Webb (born 1963), American basketball player
- Stan Webb (disambiguation), multiple people
- Stephen Webb (disambiguation), multiple people
- Steve Webb (disambiguation), multiple people
- Steven Webb (born 1984), English actor
- Stuart Webb (born 1980), Australian rugby league footballer
- Suzanne Webb (born 1966), British politician

=== T ===
- Tara Webb, Australian sound editor
- T. I. Webb Jr. (1880–1975), American lawyer
- Timothy James Webb (born 1967), Australian artist
- Thomas Webb (disambiguation), multiple people
- Todd Webb (1905–2000), American photographer
- Tony Webb (born 1945), English social scientist
- Travis Webb (1910–1990), American auto racing driver
- Tyler Webb (born 1990), American baseball player

=== U ===
- Ulysses S. Webb (1864–1947), American lawyer and politician
- Umeki Webb (born 1975), American basketball player

=== V ===
- Vanessa Webb (born 1976), Canadian tennis player
- Veronica Webb (born 1965), American model
- Violet Webb (1915–1999), English track and field athlete

=== W ===
- Wally Webb (1885–1956), Australian rugby league footballer
- Walter Webb (disambiguation), multiple people
- Watt W. Webb (1927–2020), American physicist
- Wayne Webb (born 1957), American bowler
- Wellington Webb (born 1941), American politician
- Wendy Webb (born 1962), American author
- Wilfred Webb (disambiguation), multiple people
- William Webb (disambiguation), multiple people
- Wilma Webb (born 1944), American politician
- Wilse B. Webb (1920–2018), American psychologist
- W. Roger Webb (born 1941), American academic administrator
- Wyatt Webb (1941–2003), American basketball coach
- Wyman W. Webb, Canadian judge

== See also ==
- Webb (given name), a page for people with the given name "Webb"
- Attorney General Webb (disambiguation), a disambiguation page for Attorney Generals surnamed "Webb"
- General Webb (disambiguation), a disambiguation page for Generals surnamed "Webb"
- Judge Webb (disambiguation), a disambiguation page for Judge surnamed "Webb"
- Justice Webb (disambiguation), a disambiguation page for Justices surnamed "Webb"
- Senator Webb (disambiguation), a disambiguation page for Senator surnamed "Webb"
