= Senator Webb =

Senator Webb may refer to:

== Members of the United States Senate ==
- Jim Webb (born 1946), U.S. Senator from Virginia
- William R. Webb (1842–1926), U.S. Senator from Tennessee

== United States state senate members ==
- Benjamin Joseph Webb (1814–1897), Kentucky State Senate
- Charles M. Webb (1833–1911), Wisconsin State Senate
- David Webb (politician) (born 1954), Kansas State Senate
- Doyle Webb (born 1955), Arkansas State Senate
- Edmund F. Webb (1835–1898), Maine State Senate
- Edwin Y. Webb (1872–1955), North Carolina State Senate
- Henry G. Webb (1826–1910), Wisconsin State Senate
- J. Griswold Webb (1890–1934), New York State Senate
- James L. Webb (1854–1930), North Carolina State Senate
- Julian Webb (1911–2002), Georgia State Senate
- Lea Webb (fl. 2020s), New York State Senate
- Lewis Webb (1888–1973), Nebraska State Senate
- M. Price Webb (1862–1938), Virginia State Senate
- Robin L. Webb (born 1960), Kentucky State Senate
- Roger Webb (politician) (fl. 2010s), Montana State Senate
- Samuel F. Webb (1853–1920), Arizona State Senate
- Stephen Palfrey Webb (1804–1879), Massachusetts State Senate

== Other foreign senate members ==
- Freddie Webb (born 1942), Senate of the Philippines

== See also ==
- Anthony Webbe (Missouri politician) (1901–1953), Missouri State Senate
