= Katharine Webb =

Katharine Webb (or similar) may refer to:

== Writers ==
- Catherine Webb (born 1986), English author
- Kate Webb (1943–2007), Catherine Webb, New Zealand-born Australian foreign correspondent
- Catherine Webb (co-operative activist) (1859–1947), British co-operative activist
- Catherine Berndt, née Webb (1918–1994), Australian anthropologist

== Musicians ==
- Cathy Webb (born 1965), Australian bass guitarist in Kryptonics
- Kathy Webb (born 1968), American vocalist in Good 2 Go

== Politicians and lawyers ==
- Kathy Webb (born 1949), American restaurateur and politician
- Kate Webb (politician) (born 1951), American politician in the Vermont House of Representatives
- Kathryn Webb (born 1957), American lawyer and educator, see List of law clerks for the sixth seat of the Supreme Court of the United States

== Others ==
- Katie Webb (born 1969), American Triathlon competitor, in 1990 ITU Triathlon World Championships
- Katherine Webb (born 1989), American model and beauty queen
- Katie Webb (born 1989), English ballet dancer who joined Scottish Ballet

== Characters ==
- Katherine Webb Kane, character in DC Comics who becomes Batwoman
- Cat Webb, Catarina Webb, character in Family Affairs

== See also ==
- Sarah Kate Webb (born 1977), English sailing competitor
- Katrina Webb (born 1977), Australian athlete with cerebral palsy
- Kathleen Webb (born 1956), American comic book writer/artist
- Webb (surname)
