= Benjamin Webb =

Benjamin or Ben Webb may refer to:

- Benjamin Webb (clergyman) (1819–1885), English clergyman
- Benjamin Joseph Webb (1814–1897), American politician from Kentucky
- Ben Webb (artist) (1976–2014), New Zealand-born artist
- Ben Webb (journalist) (1957–2002), Canadian journalist
- Benji Webbe (born 1967), Welsh singer
- Trent Seven (born Benjamin Maurice Webb, 1981), British wrestler
- Jinnwoo (born Ben Webb), British musician and writer
