= James Watson Webb (disambiguation) =

James Watson Webb may refer to:

- James Watson Webb (1802–1884), diplomat, newspaper publisher and a New York politician
- James Watson Webb II (1884–1960), American polo champion
- J. Watson Webb Jr. (1916–2000), American film editor

== See also ==
- James Webb (disambiguation)
