= Anthony Webb =

Anthony or Tony Webb(e) may refer to:

- Anthony Webb or Spud Webb (born 1963), American basketball player
- Anthony Webbe (English politician) (died 1578?), English Member of Parliament
- Anthony Webbe (Missouri politician) (1901–1953), American politician
- Tony Webb (born 1945), English social scientist
- Tony Webb (mayor), English mayor of Colchester
