= Jeffrey Webb =

Jeffrey Webb may refer to:

- Jeffrey Webb (football executive), former president of CONCACAF, Cayman Islands Football Association, and FIFA vice president
- Jeffrey Webb (skier), Malaysian alpine ski racer

== See also ==
- Geoffrey Webb (disambiguation)
- Jeff Webb (disambiguation)
