= Thomas Webb =

Thomas or Tom Webb may refer to:

== Arts ==
- Thomas Webb (engraver) (1797–1822), British metal engraver
- Thomas Webb (glassmaker) (1804–1869), English founder of Thomas Webb & Sons
  - Thomas Webb & Sons, English glass company
- Thomas Webb (artist, born 1991), British multidisciplinary artist

== Politics ==
- Thomas Webb (Gloucester MP) (c. 1663–1734), English MP for Gloucester
- Thomas Richmond Webb (1663–1731), English politician, MP for Calne, Cricklade and Devizes
- Sir Clifton Webb (politician) (Thomas Clifton Webb, 1889–1962), New Zealand politician and diplomat

== Religion ==
- Thomas Webb (Methodist) (1724–1796), British-born Methodist pioneer and missionary in America
- Thomas Webb (priest) (died 1797), Dean of Kilmore
- Thomas Theodor Webb (1885–1948), Methodist missionary at Milingimbi Island, northern Australia, in the 1920s

== Others ==
- Thomas Smith Webb (1771–1819), American Masonic author
- Thomas William Webb (1807–1885), British astronomer
- Thomas Webb (co-operator) (1829–1896), British co-operative movement activist
- Thomas Webb (judge) (1845–1916), Australian barrister and Supreme Court of Victoria judge
- T. I. Webb Jr. (Thomas Isham Webb Jr., 1880–1975), American golfer
- Thomas Llewelyn Webb (born 1978), British social psychologist
- Tom Webb, American college basketball coach
