= Colin Webb =

Colin Webb may refer to:

- Colin Webb (cricketer) (1926–2015), Australian cricketer
- Colin Webb (historian) (1930–1992), South African historian
- Colin Webb (physicist) (born 1937), British physicist
