= Chris Webb (disambiguation) =

Chris Webb (born 1986) is a British Labour politician.

Chris Webb or Christopher Webb may also refer to:

- Chris Webb (sculptor) (born 1954), British sculptor
- Christopher Webb (1886–1966), English stained glass designer
- Christopher Webb (cricketer) (fl. 1981/82), New Zealand cricketer
