= John Webbe =

John Webbe may refer to:

- John Webbe (died 1557) (died 1550s), MP for Dover
- John Webbe (died 1571) (1530s–1571), MP for Salisbury
- John Webbe (martyr)

== See also ==
- John Webb (disambiguation)
