= James Webb =

James, Jim or Jimmy Webb may refer to:

== Arts ==
- Jim Webb (born 1946), American author, also politician (see below)
- James Webb (historian) (1946–1980), Scottish historian
- James Webb (painter) (1825–1895), British painter
- James Webb (South African artist) (born 1975), South African artist known for sound installations
- James R. Webb (1909–1974), American screenplay writer
- Jim Webb (audio engineer), American film audio engineer
- Jim Webb (poet), American poet, playwright, and essayist
- Jimmy Webb (born 1946), American musician
- J. Watson Webb Jr. (1916–2000), American film editor
- Jim Webb (Family Affairs), a fictional character in UK soap opera Family Affairs
- Jimmy Webb (stylist) (1957–2020), American punk fashion stylist

== Public service ==
- James E. Webb (1906–1992), American official, the second Administrator of the National Aeronautics and Space Administration (NASA), namesake of the James Webb Space Telescope
- James Webb (Royal Navy officer) (died 1761), commodore governor for the Canadian province of Newfoundland and Labrador for 1760
- J. B. Webb (James B. Webb, 1929–2009), influential in shaping Australia's international relations and aid during the 1950s, 60s and 70s
- Jim Webb (born 1946), former senator from Virginia, former U.S. Secretary of the Navy, and 2016 presidential candidate
- James H. Webb (jurist), early 20th century Yale University lecturer in law; cowrote Outlines of Criminal Law with Courtney Kenny
- James H. Webb (Pennsylvania politician) (1820–1896), Pennsylvania state legislator
- James L. Webb (1854–1930), North Carolina judge and politician
- James Watson Webb (1802–1884), American newspaper publisher and New York politician
- Jim Webb (Canadian politician), founding member of the New Brunswick Confederation of Regions Party
- James Webb (Texas politician) (1792–1856), Attorney General in the Republic of Texas, Secretary of State for the State of Texas
- James Webb (Australian politician) (1887–1939), member of the New South Wales Legislative Assembly
- James C. Webb, member of the New Hampshire House of Representatives
- James Webb (Medal of Honor) (1841–1915), American Union Army soldier and Medal of Honor recipient

== Sports ==
- James Webb (rugby union) (1863–1913), Wales rugby international player
- Skeeter Webb (James Laverne Webb, 1909–1986), Major League Baseball player
- Jim Webb (judo) (James R. Webb), president of the United States Judo Association
- Jim Webb (rugby) (1878–1955), Welsh rugby international player
- Jim Webb (boxer) (bron 1969), Northern Irish boxer
- Jimmy Webb (American football) (born 1952), American football player
- James Watson Webb II (1884–1960), American polo champion
- Jimmy Webb (climber) (born 1987), rock climber specializing in bouldering
- James Webb III (born 1993), American professional basketball player

== See also ==
- James Webbe (died 1557), MP for Devizes
- James Webb Space Telescope, an infrared space-based telescope named after James E. Webb
