= Eddie Armstrong =

American politician

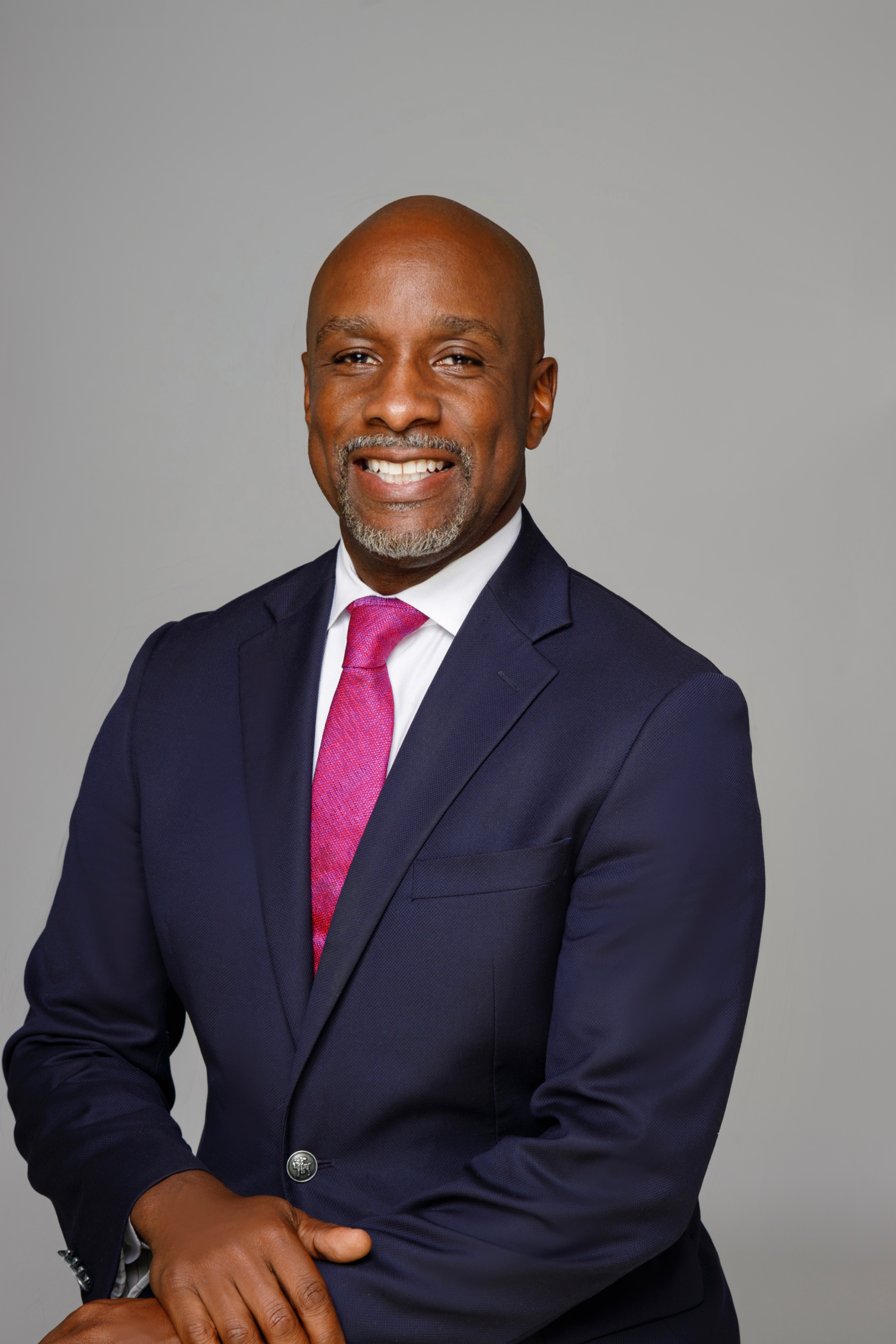

Member of the Arkansas House of Representatives from the 37th district
- In office January 14, 2013 – January 14, 2019
- Preceded by: Kathy Webb
- Succeeded by: Jamie Aleshia Scott

Personal details
- Born: North Little Rock, Arkansas, U.S.
- Party: Democratic
- Education: University of Arkansas

Eddie L. Armstrong III (born in North Little Rock, Arkansas) is an American politician and a Democratic member of the Arkansas House of Representatives representing District 37 since January 14, 2013. He was the House Minority Leader from 2015 to 2017, when he was succeeded by David Whitaker.

As minority leader, Armstrong worked opposite Republican then Majority Leader Ken Bragg of Grant County. In 2010, he was active in the failed reelection bid waged by Democrat Blanche Lincoln for the United States Senate. Lincoln lost to Republican John Boozman.

== Education ==
Armstrong earned his Bachelor of Arts in Political Science from the University of Arkansas at Fayetteville.

== Elections ==
- 2012 When District 37 Representative Kathy Webb left the Legislature and left the seat open, Armstrong won the three-way May 22, 2012 Democratic Primary with 964 votes (58.4%), and was unopposed for the November 6, 2012 General election.
