= Michael Webb =

Michael Webb may refer to:

- Mike Webb (pastor) (born 1956), Australian musician and church pastor
- Mike Webb (radio host) (1955–2007), American radio personality murdered in 2007
- Mike Webb (rugby union) (born 1979), Canadian rugby union player
- Michael Webb (architect) (born 1937), founding member of Archigram
- Mickey Webb, fictional character in The Bill
- Mojo Webb, musician
