= Edmund Webb =

Edmund Webb may refer to:

- Edmund Webb (Australian politician) (1830–1899), Australian politician
- Edmund Webb (MP) (1639–1705), English politician
- Edmund F. Webb (1835–1898), American politician from Maine

== See also ==
- Edward Webb (disambiguation)
