= James A. Bowley =

American politician

Member of the South Carolina House of Representatives from Georgetown County
- In office 1869–1874
- Preceded by: Henry W. Webb

Personal details
- Died: January 30, 1891
- Party: Republican
- Spouse: Laura Clark

Military service
- Allegiance: United States (Union)
- Branch/service: United States Navy
- Years of service: 1863–1865
- Rank: Boatman
- Battles/wars: American Civil War

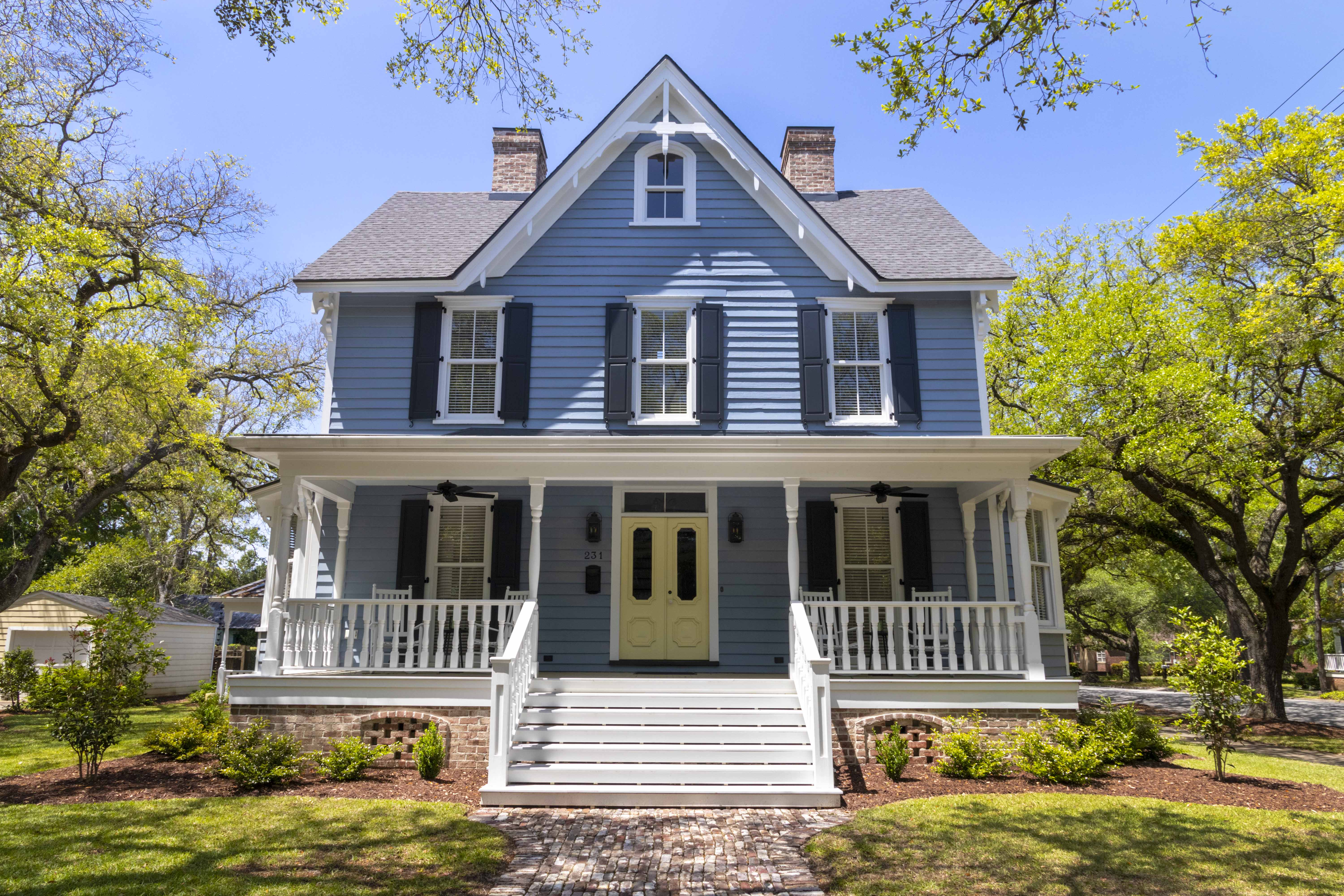
James A. Bowley Home in Georgetown, South Carolina

James Alfred Bowley (c.1844 – January 30, 1891) was an American teacher, lawyer, judge, school commissioner, politician, and newspaper publisher in South Carolina. He escaped slavery in Maryland with help from Harriet Tubman. He served in the U.S. Navy. After the American Civil War he moved to Georgetown, South Carolina, taught in schools and was elected to the South Carolina House of Representatives. His former home in Georgetown, where he lived with his wife Laura Clark (1854–1932), is a historic site.

== Early life, escape, and education ==
Bowley was the son of John Bowley and Kessiah Bowley. His mother was Harriet Tubman's niece, and the two were so close in age and had such a close relationship that they considered themselves sisters. Kessiah Bowley, James, and his sister Araminta were owned by Eliza Ann Brodess in Dorchester County, the woman whom Harriet Tubman had fled from just two years earlier (1848.) Upon hearing that Kessiah and her children would be placed on the auction block in December 1850, Tubman quickly departed for Baltimore and concocted a plan with Kessiah's husband, John.

During the auction, John Bowley somehow managed to secure the highest bid without being identified. By the time Dorchester County officials realized what had happened, the three slaves had been secreted to a nearby safe-house. Amazingly, the Bowley's were able to sail a small boat up the Chesapeake Bay to Baltimore, where Tubman reunited with them. From there, they were guided to Philadelphia. However, the newly passed Fugitive Slave Act made it increasingly dangerous for Eastern Shore runaways to reside in nearby "free" states. Kessiah, John, and Araminta made their way to Canada soon after the escape, settling in Chatham, Ontario where a black fugitive community had developed. However, James remained in Philadelphia with Tubman for some time, in order to go to school. She was estimated to have spent about half her income towards her nephew's education during that time, though it is unknown where he attended or for how long.

In a letter to his "Aunt" Harriet in 1868, [Bowley] noted he was one of her "first passengers from the house of bondage." His words were intended to be a part of Sarah Bradford's biography, Scenes in the Life of Harriet Tubman, but for some reason they were not included.

== Civil war ==
In 1863 James joined the Union Navy and served as a Boatman on the vessel USS Genessee during the Civil War.

== Career ==
After the Civil War ended, James chose to help newly emancipated slaves by working as a teacher [c.1867] for the Freedmen's Bureau in Georgetown, South Carolina. Bowley was about to enter a successful, but highly controversial, second phase of his life in the Reconstruction era. Bowley quickly established himself as an influential figure, more than just an educator, in this tumultuous period in South Carolina. By 1870, he had married Laura Clark, a mulatto native of Georgetown. He is listed as the "school commissioner" and owned a small amount of property, living amongst other civil servants of both races.

In 1869, Bowley ran in a special election for the Georgetown state representative to fill a seat vacated by the death of Henry W. Web. He ran as a Radical Republican and won the seat by a majority of 1,000 votes and over 85% of the cast votes. He was re-elected in 1870 and 1872.

Bowley's legislative position ultimately became the source of many of his difficulties, as it was for many Republicans, who were constantly accused of corruption or incompetence. For some time, Bowley chaired the Committee on Ways and Means, a prominent body that determined tax codes and other revenue building actions of the state assembly. The Anderson Times, a politically conservative and Democratically leaning newspaper, reported in 1872 that "Hon. Mr. Bowley, from Georgetown, is a colored man, and judging from his craniology, physiognomy and tautology, we fear he will make the ways and means very easy." The implication, which was reflected in many Reconstruction era southern papers' discussion of black politicians, was that James was mentally unfit for the position and would likely be susceptible to bribery.

In 1872, Bowley was the second black lawyer to appear in the courts of Georgetown. Bowley read law under Macon B. Allen in Charleston for two years, and in 1872 passed the bar examination administered by Allen, John G.Mackey, and C.W. Buttz and was admitted by circuit judge R.F. Graham.

In 1873, Bowley founded a weekly newspaper the Georgetown Planet, with a focus of politics, literature and science. It was a Republican paper, the only one in Georgetown.

James was named a trustee of the University of South Carolina in 1873, just as it was to enter a brief phase of integration. Fear of black inclusion had caused enrollment to plummet to just eight students, the majority of which were professor's sons. The legal impediments to black enrollment had been removed in 1869 but the first African-American student, South Carolina Secretary of State, Henry E. Hayne, did not register until October 1873. Even after making tuition free, Bowley and the other trustees were unable to fill seats at the university. They ultimately had to convince Howard University students and others to transfer, resulting in a more respectable number that was about 90% black by 1875.

== Political tumult ==
He had a highly publicized feud with fellow Republican William H. Jones, damaging the image of Reconstruction era black politicians. South Carolina whites jumped at the opportunity to chastise the "war between colored factions." An account from The Charleston News, reproduced in The New York Times, reflected this eager judgement on the part of white Democrats. In mid-August, it claimed that "the town ... was entirely at the mercy and in the possession of a mob of mad negro savages." The altercation apparently began at a meeting of the delegates to the state Republican Convention, which ended in a bullet-riddled melee.

Jones represented the rural, former plantation slaves of local birth, and he also had control of the local militia. Bowley, the more educated northerner, aligned with the mixed-race Republicans who lived in Georgetown proper. The night after the initial fight, attacks spread into the streets and ultimately to the men's homes. William H. Jones' house was shot full of bullets, leaving him with a wounded thumb and several others hurt. By this time, James Bowley had been taken to jail for safekeeping, which proved to be a wise decision. A mob of Jones' supporters came upon their opponent's home, inflicting significant damage but falling short of burning it down, as they threatened to do. Bowley was escorted out of town soon after, as the state militia worked to restore order. The author seemed to revel in the chaos, claiming that "their savage impetuosity ... is a feature of Republican government." No opportunity was lost to emphasize the negative characteristics of African-Americans that allegedly drove them to such measures. The account also included thinly veiled accusations of corruption against Bowley, asserting that he "in two years, made a handsome fortune of $50,000 or $60,000 on a salary of $600 a year." Seemingly he was not charged for inciting the violence, and the political outcome for both men is unclear.

Bowley and a group of his supporters were placed in custody and transported to Charleston, SC on the US Steam Cutter Moccasin arriving in Charleston on August 28, 1874. The supporters were Peter Woodbury, Pallas Judon, Anthony Juden, Ben Tamplet, Frank Penno, John Smiley, Phoenix Coit, Wm. R. Beamer, Edward Lawrence, Henry Clark, Daniel Reynolds, Henry Smith and Geo. Pawley. They were represented by counsel, Mr. M. T. Dooley.

Bowley told his side of the feud in an article in the Charleston News and Courier reproduced by The Horry Weekly News While Jones and Bowley were initially friendly having met when Jones was in the State Legislature and Bowley was a school commissioner, the friendship disintegrated when Bowley disagreed with Jones' support of Benjamin Franklin Whittemore for the U.S House of Representatives. Whittemore would ultimately be censured in 1870 for selling appointments to the US Naval Academy. As a result, Jones worked to try to defeat Bowley in his 1872 reelection. Bowley was ultimately successful in the election with the help of Joseph H. Rainey. At the beginning of the 1874 election cycle Jones declared that he would defeat Bowley at any cost. Jones proceeded to send his supporters and the militia he headed to disturb Bowley's political meetings and to prevent Bowley from speaking. These practices escalated until a group of Bowley's supporters rallied without his knowledge and attacked Jones' house in Georgetown.

A "treaty of peace" was later agreed to and signed by both Jones and Bowley. The agreement was presided over by Macon Bolling Allen of the Criminal Court of Charleston and, as a result, the men where not criminally charged for their contributions to the riot.

Bowley, like many other Reconstruction era public officials, could not escape the accusations of corruption or other political guile. In 1878, [he] was implicated by former Governor Franklin J. Moses Jr. in a bribery case, which had originated during the "ku klux prosecutions" in the early part of the decade. White Democrats ironically lamented that the legal system at that "white men, charged with crime or injustice toward negroes, had no rights which they (the negroes) were bound to respect." The state legislation which created funding for the prosecutions was allegedly passed with substantial bribes at the highest levels of the local government. After the governor took his share, "a further warrant for twenty-five hundred dollars was put in his hands, to be given to Bowley." However, James Alfred was not convicted in this or in a prior case of a similar nature. Opponents claimed that political connections had shielded Bowley from prosecution. In the highly polarized climate, it is difficult to determine how much truth each case carried, especially when using explicitly partisan newspaper accounts.

Bowley lost his seat in the South Carolina House of Representatives in 1874. He continued to participate in the election process as an Elections Clerk at 'Griers poll' during the 1876 National Congressional election between John S. Richardson and Joseph H. Rainey. Richardson challenged the result as invalid on the grounds of intimidation of Democrats by federal soldiers and black militias guarding the polls and Bowley was called to testify in the resulting Congressional investigation: John S. Richardson, Contestant, vs. Joseph H. Rainey, Contestee.

== Later years and death ==
After the Reconstruction period ended, Bowley returned to teaching in local Georgetown schools. As late as 1888 he was teaching in the 'Colored Graded School' in Georgetown.

Bowley served as an "enumerator" for the 1890 U.S. Census in Georgetown County, South Carolina.

Bowley died January 30, 1891, while holding the position of Judge of Probate for Georgetown.

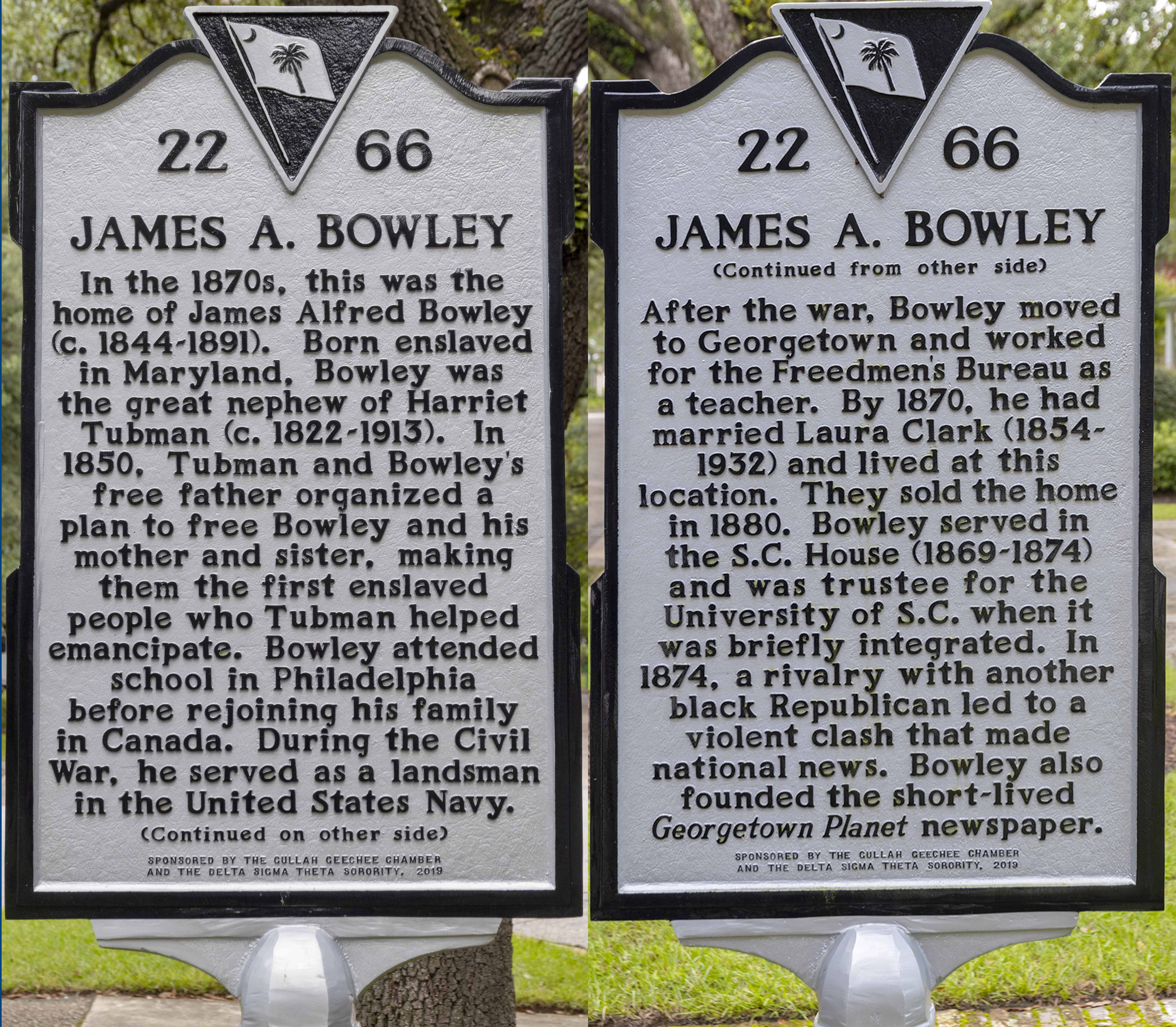
James A. Bowley Historical Marker

In 2019, a historical marker was placed by the home he built in Georgetown, South Carolina.

== Sculpture: Whispers of My Ancestor ==
On May 28, 2026, a sculpture called Whispers of My Ancestor depicting James A. Bowley and Harriet Tubman was unveiled and dedicated at the Georgetown County Library located at 405 Cleland Street in Georgetown, SC.

The sculpture was commissioned by the Friends of the Georgetown Library and was sculpted by Wesley Wofford. Wesley Wofford is an Academy Award winning American figurative sculptor. His studio is located in Cashiers, NC.

Wofford learned of the relationship that Harriet Tubman had with her great-nephew, James A. Bowley, while visiting Georgetown SC in 2022. He found the newly unearthed history deeply moving and inspirational, and conceived the vision for Whispers of My Ancestor. He collaborated with direct descendants of Tubman and Bowley, and enlisted local Georgetown models Marva Riley and Emrys Elijah James Berry, and hairstylist Tammy Dease to help capture the figurative forms of the sculpture.

The sculpture “speaks of the power of building on the foundations of those that came before us, and the long-term effects of nurturing education to uplift the next generation.”

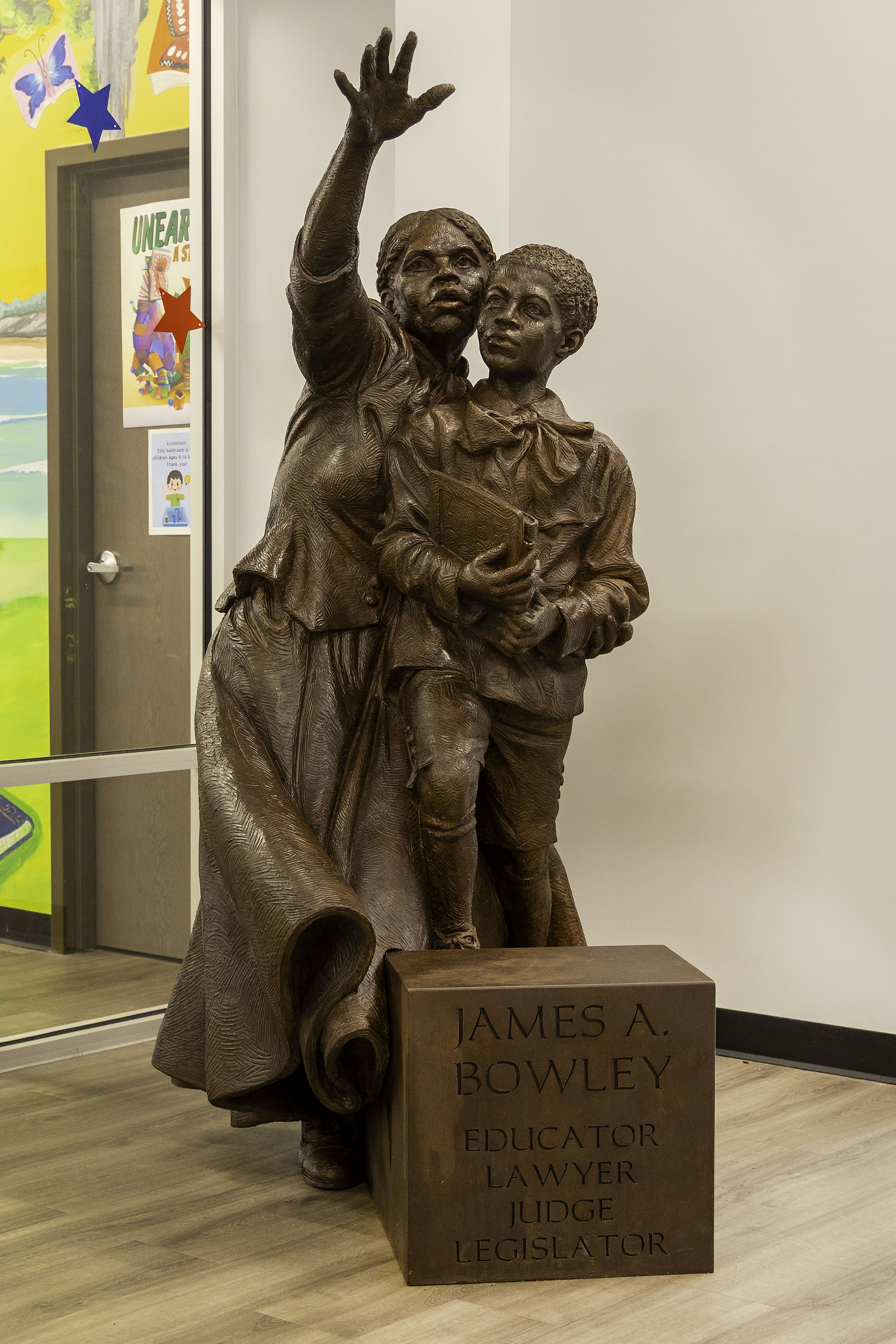
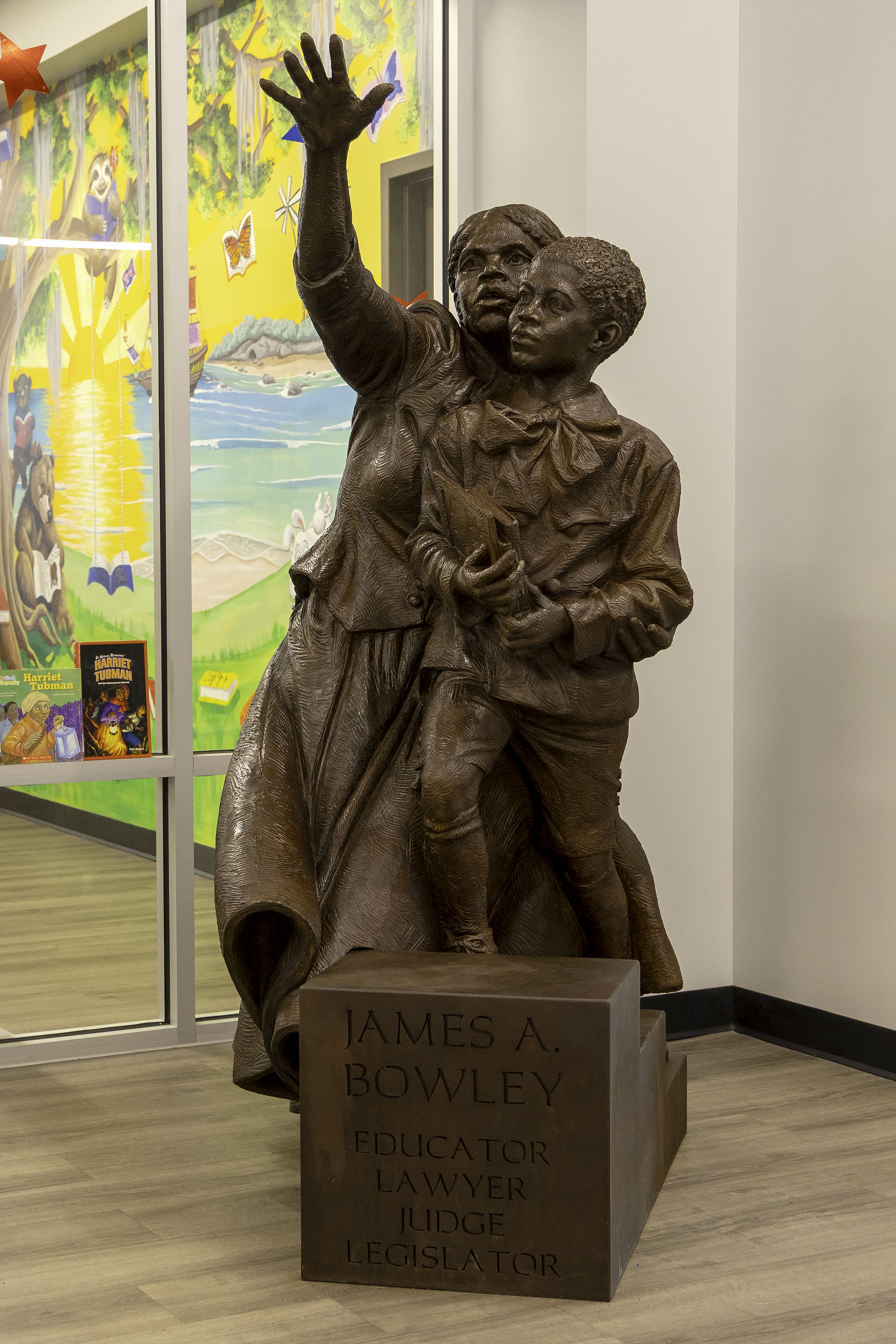
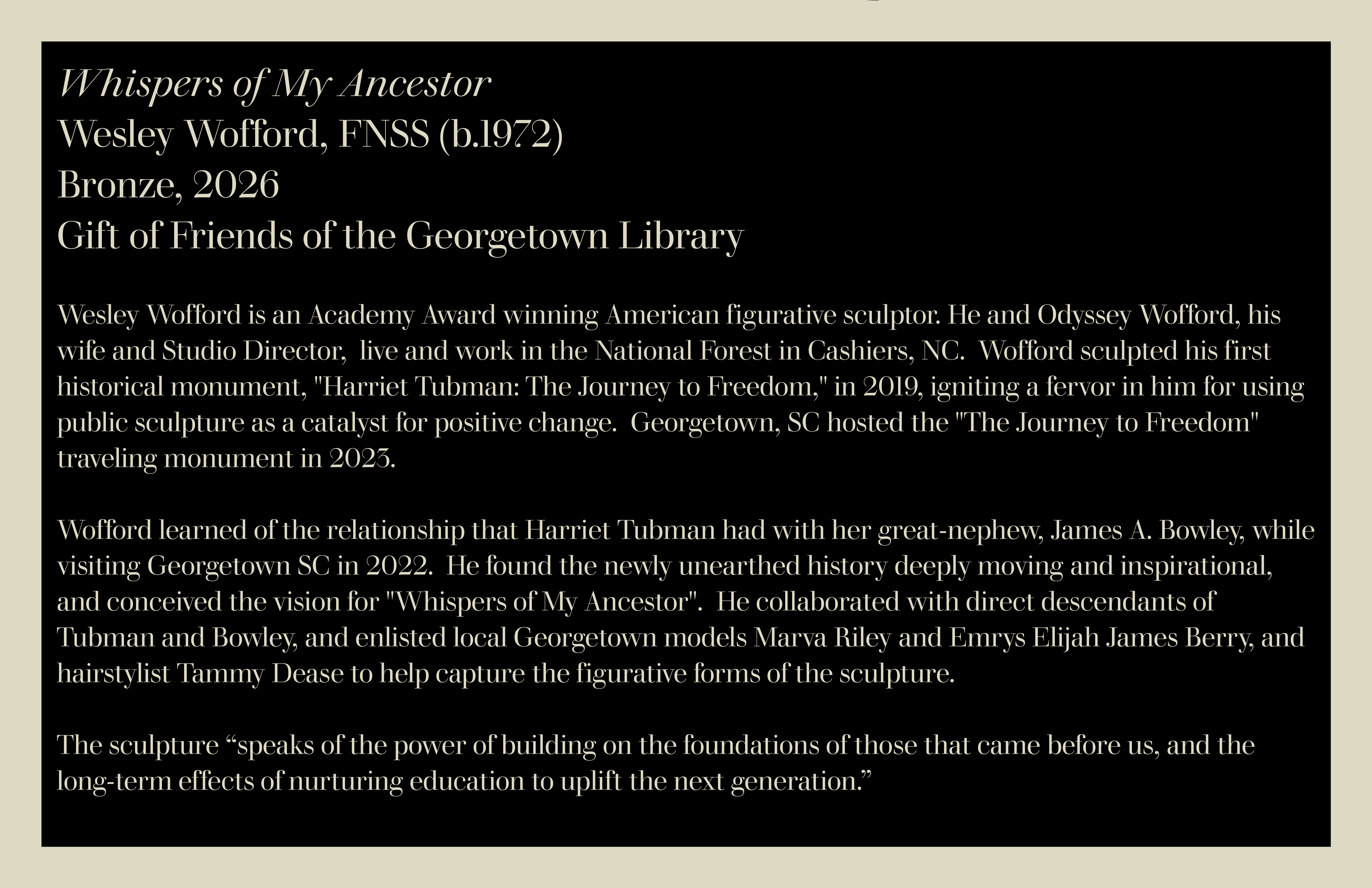

== See also ==
- African American officeholders from the end of the Civil War until before 1900
