= Steve Webb (disambiguation) =

Steve Webb (born 1965) is a British politician.

Steve or Steven Webb may also refer to:

- Steve Webb (medical physicist) (born 1948), British medical physicist and writer
- Steve Webb (ice hockey) (born 1975), Canadian ice hockey player
- Steven Webb (born 1984), British actor
- Steve Webb (Missouri politician), member of the Missouri House of Representatives

== See also ==
- Stephen Webb (disambiguation)
