= Walter Webb =

Walter Webb may refer to:

- Walter Prescott Webb, American historian
- Walter Freeman Webb, American ornithologist, conchologist and shell dealer
- H. Walter Webb, American railway executive
- Wally Webb, Australian rugby league player
