= Henry Webb =

Henry Webb may refer to:

- Sir Henry Webb, 1st Baronet (1866–1940), British politician
- Henry Webb (actor) (1906–1990), British actor in Hadleigh (TV series)
- Henry G. Webb (1826–1910), American politician in Wisconsin and Kansas
- Henry J. Webb (1846–1893), English scholar
- Henry Richard Webb (1829–1901), New Zealand politician
- H. Walter Webb (1856–1900), United States journalist
- Henry W. Webb, member of the South Carolina House of Representatives
- Henry Y. Webb (1784–1823), American jurist and state legislator
- Hank Webb (born 1950), United States Major League Baseball player

== See also ==
- Henry Webbe, MP for Devizes
- Harry Webb (disambiguation)
