= Kevin Webb =

Kevin Webb may refer to:

- Kevin Webb (Australian rules football) (born 1928), Australian rules football player in the Victorian Football League (VFL)
- Kevin Webb (rugby league) (born 1955), Australian rugby league football player in the New South Wales Rugby League Premiership (NSWRFL)

== See also ==
- Kevyn Webb (1924–1990), Australian rower
