= Australian Volunteers International =

Aid organisation

- Abbreviation: AVI
- Formation: 1951
- Legal status: Non-profit organization
- Purpose: Recruit skilled professionals from Australia to work with partner organisations in Asia, the Pacific, Africa and the Middle East
- Location: Australia
- Region served: Asia, the Pacific, Africa and the Middle East
- Leader: Chief Executive Officer, Paul Bird
- Website: www.australianvolunteers.com

Australian Volunteers International or AVI recruits skilled professionals from Australia to work with partner organisations in Asia, the Pacific, Africa and the Middle East. Its work focuses on reducing poverty, promoting human rights and gender equality, increasing access to education and health services, and protecting the environment.

In the last 50 years AVI have placed more than 6000 volunteers and other field workers in 70 countries.

== Purpose and function ==
AVI has a vision of a peaceful and just world; where all people have access to the resources they need, the opportunity to achieve their potential, the right to make decisions about the kind of development they want and to participate in the future of their own communities.

Through the AVI Volunteer Program, skilled Australians live and work with local organisations and communities, sharing their skills, and building relationships with local people. They receive support including airfares, living allowances, and insurance.

The organisation also offers a range of people-centred development projects. It runs a short-term program for young Australians, and a range of professional services to Australian organisations including international recruitment and cultural effectiveness training.

AVI programs are funded by the Australian Government through DFAT, other government and corporate agencies, and donations from the Australian community.

== History ==
The first volunteer, Herb Feith, travelled to Jakarta, Indonesia, in 1951, taking up the challenge to work alongside Indonesians as a translator as the country dealt with issues of independence. His journey helped establish the Volunteer Graduate Scheme to Indonesia.

In 1961 the Volunteer Graduate Scheme became the Overseas Service Bureau, an organisation with Jim Webb as its founding Director. In 1963, The Bureau launched a program called Australian Volunteers Abroad (AVA) and the first 14 Australian Volunteers (AVAs) commenced assignments in Papua New Guinea, the Solomon Islands, Tanzania and Nigeria. In 1999 it changed its name to Australian Volunteers International.

AVI is governed by a Board of Directors, Chief Executive Officer Paul Bird, and a Senior Management Team.

== Bibliography ==
- Blackburn, Susan (2015). Breaking out: memories of Melbourne in the 1970s. Willoughby, NSW: Hale & Iremonger. ISBN 978-0-86806-922-7.
- Purdey, Jemma (2011). From Vienna to Yogyakarta: The Life of Herb Feith. UNSW Press. ISBN 9781742232805.
