= Mary Webb (disambiguation) =

Mary Webb (1881–1927) was an English romantic novelist and poet of the early 20th century.

Mary Webb may also refer to:

- Mary Webb (artist) (born 1942), British abstract painter
- Mary Webb (cricketer) (born 1936), New Zealand player from 1957 to 1961
- Mary E. Webb (1827–1859), African American actress and orator
- Mary Estus Jones Webb (1924–1995), mayor of Baton Rouge
- Mary Webb, Canadian national netball team manager in the 2010s

== See also ==
- Maria Webb (1804–1873), Irish philanthropist and writer
- Mary Webb School and Science College, Shropshire, England
- Thomas and Mary Webb House, a historic 1903 home in Lehi, Utah
