= Jane Webb (Northampton, Virginia) =

Jane Webb, also known as Jane Williams, was an indentured servant in Northampton County of the Colony of Virginia. She entered a seven-year contract with Thomas Savage so that she could marry an enslaved man named Left. It allowed for children born during those seven years to be bound over to Savage, but after she was free, Webb expected her children to be free. Savage used the courts to his advantage and also used stall tactics to prevent the case from being settled. In the end, Left and their children were enslaved to Savage and his heirs.

== Early life ==
Jane Webb, born free, was a mixed-race daughter of a white woman. She worked as an indentured servant.

== Marriage and children ==
Webb wanted to marry a black enslaved man named Left in 1703 or 1704. To do so, she entered into a signed contract with Left's enslaver, Thomas Savage, who was a slaveholder and planter. In order to marry Left, she agreed to work for Savage for seven years. During that time, if she had any children, they would serve Savage. The period of the children's servitude was not clear. At the end of the seven years, her contract would be complete, Left would be freed, and Savage would not have a claim to children born after the seven year period. While indentured to Savage, she and Left had three children, Diana or Dinah, Daniel, and Francis Webb. Under Partus sequitur ventrem, the children took their status from their mother, so they should be free. Although it was quite unusual for an enslaved person to marry, their marriage was legally valid.

== Background ==
Free blacks made up 10% of the population of Northampton County, Virginia. To ensure their rights, it was common for blacks to file cases in court. Unusual for the time, Webb was the head of the family household, since Left was enslaved.

== Legal battle ==
In 1711, Webb expected to leave Savage with Left and their children. They disagreed about the arrangement for the children and Savage would not allow Left or the children to be freed. He submitted a letter to the county court of Northampton to have the children bound to him and his heirs. The court agreed with him.

Webb went to court in 1722 to have her children freed. She contented that since she was married when she had the children, they should not be enslaved. Savage did not show up in court. He said he was sick and the case was continued a term. That happened several more times. Then the case was dismissed, claiming that Webb filed a frivolous case.

Savage then wanted two more children—Lisha and Abimelech—born after Webb completed of her contract. Savage contended that since she was unable to financially support the children, Savage was best suited to take care of them and to prevent them from being "induced to take ill courses", but their arrangement did not allow for the two children to be bound over to Savage. He could not produce the contract, but he brought witnesses who stated that the agreement with Webb was to be able to have all children born to Webb.

Webb tried to free her children and Left at the chancery court in March 1725. She argued that since Webb would not produce the contract, she did not have a way to prove their arrangement. She asked that he be brought into court. On July 12, 1726, the court ruled that Lisha and Abimilech were both to Savage and Webb was arrested for allegedly stating that "if all Virginia Negroes had as a good as heart as she had they would all be free." She was ordered to receive 10 lashes of the whip. In November 1726, the court told Webb that she needed to provide proof to get her children and husband; Savage claimed he never agreed to free Left. She brought African American witnesses to court in December 1726, but they were not considered admissible and were not heard. After a couple more attempts in 1727, she realized she would not win. Left, her children, and now her children remained bound to Savage and his heirs.
