= Jim Webb (judo) =

American judoka

James R. Webb is a retired American businessman who is a former president of the United States Judo Association elected in 2006. He is a former national judo champion, international coach and international referee, and holds a ninth degree black belt in judo, a ninth degree black belt in jujitsu, and a second degree black belt in karate. He currently serves on the board of the US Olympic Committee's National Governing Body for judo, USA Judo. In addition, he has furthered his judo education by attending both the Kodokan Judo Summer Course and Kodokan Judo Kata Course workshops in Japan. He was a long-time student of 9th Dan Vince Tamura.

Dr. Webb was educated at West Point, the University of Dallas, MIT, Southern Methodist University, and the University of Maryland. He subsequently provided leadership to such prominent consulting firms as Price Waterhouse, Deloitte & Touche and A.T. Kearney. Prior to his strategy consulting career, he served as a Special Forces commanding officer. He is currently a professor and program director at Southern Methodist University. Dr. Webb is also a member of the Baker Street Irregulars.

His latest book is Innovators Who Changed the World: Timeless Leadership Lessons from West Point, Green Berets, Sherlock Holmes, and Wall Street.
