= Sarah Webb =

Sarah or Sara Webb may refer to:

- Sarah Webb (sailor) (born 1977), British sailor
- Sarah Webb (painter) (born 1948), American painter
- Sarah Webb (housing administrator) (died 2011), British housing professional
- Sarah Webb (writer), Irish writer
- Sara Webb (dancer) (born 1979), American ballet dancer
- Sara Webb (astrophysicist), Australian astrophysicist, science communicator and author
