= Carl C. Webb =

American journalist

Carl Curtis Web (1901-1996) was a journalist, and journalism professor at the University of Oregon, and head of the Oregon Newspaper Publishers Association. He earned his Bachelor of Science in Journalism degree at Oregon in 1932. In 1943 he became secretary and field manager of the ONPA. At that time he was editing the Freewater Times. He was elected vice president of the national Newspaper Association Managers in 1945. He won the National Newspaper Association President's Award in 1968. He retired in 1971.

He was inducted into the Oregon Newspaper Hall of Fame in 1984 and had an award named after him in 1992.
