= Patrick Webb =

Patrick Webb may refer to:

- Patrick Webb (nutritionist)
- Patrick Webb (artist)
- Paddy Webb, New Zealand trade unionist and politician
