= Paul Webb (disambiguation) =

Paul Webb is an English musician.

Paul Webb may also refer to:

- Paul Webb (basketball), college basketball coach
- Paul Webb (footballer), English footballer
- Paul Webb (screenwriter), British screenwriter and playwright
