= Clifton Webb (disambiguation) =

Clifton Webb (1889–1966) was an American actor.

Clifton Webb may also refer to:

- Clifton Webb (sailor) (born 1978), New Zealand sailor
- Clifton Webb (politician) (1889–1962), New Zealand politician
