= Alexander Webb =

Alexander Webb may refer to:

- Alexander Russell Webb (1846–1916), one of the earliest Americans to convert to Islam
- Alexander S. Webb (1835–1911), general in the American Civil War, defended the famous "Copse of Trees" during Pickett's Charge at the Battle of Gettysburg, 1863
- Alexander Stewart Webb (banker) (1870–1948), American banker and philanthropist

== See also ==
- Alexander Webbe, cricketer
- Alex Webb (disambiguation)
