= Maurice Webb =

Maurice Webb may refer to:

- Maurice Webb (architect) (1880–1939), English architect
- Maurice Webb (politician) (1904–1956), British Labour politician
- Maurice Webb, president of the South African Institute of Race Relations 1943–1945
