= Edwin Webb =

Edwin Webb may refer to:

- Edwin C. Webb (1921–2006), British biochemist
- Edwin Y. Webb (1872–1955), American politician and judge from North Carolina
