= Frank Webb =

Frank Webb may refer to:

- Frank Webb (artist) (1927–2022), American watercolor painter
- Frank J. Webb (1828–1894), African-American novelist, poet and essayist
- Frank Elbridge Webb (1869–1949), American engineer and presidential candidate in 1928 and 1932
