= Justice Webb =

Justice Webb may refer to:

- Henry Y. Webb (1784–1823), associate justice of the Alabama Supreme Court
- John Webb (judge) (1926–2008), associate justice of the North Carolina Supreme Court
- William Webb (judge) (1887–1972), associate justice and chief justice of the Supreme Court of Queensland and the High Court of Australia

== See also ==
- Judge Webb (disambiguation)
