= Harry Webb =

Harry Webb may refer to:

- Harry S. Webb (1892–1959), American film director
- Harry Webb (communist) (1889–1962), British communist activist
- Harry Webb (politician) (1908–2000), Australian politician
- Harri Webb (1920–1994), Anglo-Welsh poet
- Cliff Richard (Harry Rodger Webb, born 1940), British pop singer

== See also ==
- Harold Webbe (1885–1965), British politician
- Henry Webb (disambiguation)
