= Caroline Webb =

British author, economist and executive coach

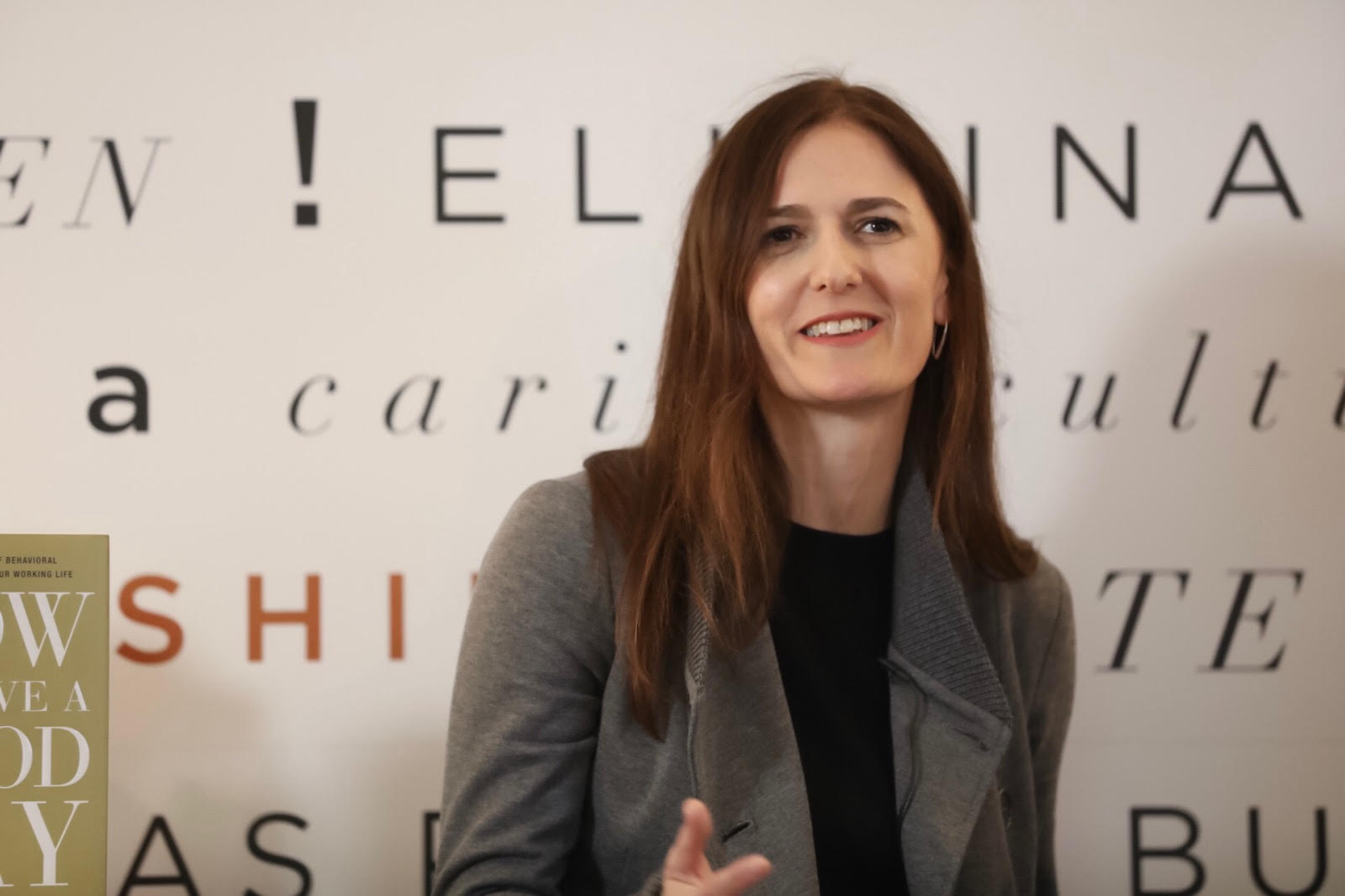
- Caroline Webb speaking at an event in Davos in 2017
- Born: Caroline Michelle Christine Webb; 1971 (age 54–55); New Milton, Hampshire, England, United Kingdom
- Occupations: Economist & author
- Writing career
- Subjects: Economics; Behavioural economics; Organizational change; Psychology
- Website: carolinewebb.co

Caroline Michelle Christine Webb (born 1971) is a British author, economist and executive coach. Her first book, How to Have a Good Day (Crown Business 2016), argues that insights from behavioural economics, psychology and neuroscience can be used to improve working life. Her second book, Leadership Intelligence (Crown Currency 2026), examines how insights from cognitive and behavioral science can be applied to common management challenges.

She has written multiple articles for Harvard Business Review, and has also written on behavioural change topics for Fast Company, Wired UK, Quartz, Business Insider and the World Economic Forum.

== Education ==
From 1987 to 1989, Webb attended the United World College of the Atlantic, one of the United World Colleges. She then attended the University of Cambridge, graduating in 1992 with a first class bachelor's degree in economics, and received her MPhil from the University of Oxford in economics in 1997.

== Career ==
From 1992 to 1993, Webb was a research fellow at the Levy Economics Institute. From 1993 to 2000, Webb was an economist at the Bank of England, where her work covered a range of international and domestic public policy issues, including the UK government's support to reforms in central and eastern Europe, and forecasting of the US economy. From 1998 to 2000, she was one of the authors of the Bank of England Inflation Report.

In 2000, Webb joined McKinsey & Company, where she was made a partner in 2008. Her work centred on organisational change and leadership development, including executive coaching.

In 2012, Webb founded Sevenshift, a coaching and consulting firm specialising in helping professionals boost performance and well-being through application of insights from behavioural science. She remains an external senior adviser to McKinsey.

In 2017, Webb became a member of the Silicon Guild, a group of thought leaders and best-selling authors who write about the ideas and trends shaping business and society. In 2017, she joined the advisory board of Ethical Systems, a non-profit organisation dedicated to practical applications of research on the value of ethics in business. In 2020, she joined the advisory board of the Constructive Dialogue Institute, a non-profit organisation providing skill-building programs to support productive debate in higher education.

Webb was named to the Thinkers50 Coaches50 list in 2024 and 2026. In 2025, she was included in an Inc. magazine list of leadership and management experts compiled by columnist Jeff Haden. Her work has been featured by the Financial Times, The Economist, The New York Times, The Guardian, Time, Inc., Forbes, Business Insider, The Daily Telegraph, BBC Radio and ABC Radio National.

== Books ==
On February 2, 2016, Crown Business published How to Have a Good Day: Harness the Power of Behavioral Science to Transform Your Working Life in North America. It appeared on a number of "best of" book lists, including those in Forbes, Fortune, and Inc. How to Have a Good Day was also published in two UK and Commonwealth editions by Pan Macmillan, in two French editions by Editions Belfond and Pocket, in Italian by De Agostini Editore, in Dutch by Business Contact, in Spanish by Planeta Libros, in Portuguese by Editorial Presença, in Brazilian Portuguese by Editora Schwarcz, in simplified Chinese by China Citic, in complex Chinese by Locus Publishing, in Korean by Tornado, in Japanese by Soshisha, in Romanian by Editura Publica, in Hungarian by Libri Könyvkiadó, in Ukrainian by Nash Format Publishing, and in Turkish by Mundi (Can). There is also a Persian translation.

On September 8, 2026, Crown Currency published Leadership Intelligence: Science-Backed Strategies for Mastering 21 Everyday Management Challenges. It was published in the UK and Commonwealth by Pan Macmillan on September 10, 2026, under the title Leadership Intelligence: 21 Everyday Management Challenges and How to Master Them. Leadership Intelligence appeared on the USA Today bestseller list on September 16, 2026.

Webb wrote two chapters in Leading for Tomorrow (Wiley, 2026), a leadership anthology edited by Chris Shipley and Scott Barry Kaufman. She contributed chapters to the HBR Guide to Being More Productive and the HBR Guide to Dealing with Conflict. An interview with Webb was featured in Philosophy@Work, a Thinkers50 book edited by Anders Indset (Unbound, 2022).

== Personal life ==
Webb lives in New York with her husband, Cabe Franklin.
