= John Webb =

John Webb may refer to:

== Politics and law ==
- John Webb (died 1795) (1730–1795), English politician
- John Webb (judge) (1926–2008), Associate Justice of the North Carolina Supreme Court
- John C. Webb (1915–2000), Virginia lawyer and politician
- J. Griswold Webb (John Griswold Webb, 1890–1934), New York politician
- John Leland Webb (1794–1846), Pennsylvania politician
- John Richmond Webb (judge) (1721–1766), English lawyer, Member of Parliament and Welsh judge

== Sports ==
- John Webb (athlete) (1936–2022), British Olympic athlete
- John Webb (footballer) (born 1952), English former professional footballer
- John Webb (baseball) (born 1979), Major League Baseball player
- John Webb (rower) (1930–2006), South African Olympic rower
- John Webb (paediatrician) (1918–2010), English cricketer and paediatrician

== Other ==
- John Webb (architect) (1611–1672), English architect
- John Richmond Webb (1667–1724), British army officer
- John Webb (landscape designer) (1754–1828), English landscape designer; partner of William Emes
- John Joshua Webb (1847–1882), American outlaw
- John Stanley Webb (1920–2002), English transport historian
- Jack Webb (novelist) (1916–2008), mystery writer
- Jack Webb (John Randolph Webb, 1920–1982), creator and star of Dragnet
- John Webb (composer) (born 1969), English composer
- John G. Webb, Canadian cardiologist, professor at the University of British Columbia
- John Percival Webb, commissioner on the Melbourne Harbour Trust in Melbourne, Australia

== See also ==
- John Beavor-Webb (1849–1927), Irish naval architect
- John Webbe (disambiguation)
- John Webb's Mill, Thaxted, Thaxted, Essex, England
- Jonathan Webb (born 1963), English rugby union player
