= Jeff Webb =

Jeff Webb may refer to:

- Jeff Webb (gridiron football) (born 1982), American gridiron football wide receiver
- Jeff Webb (basketball) (born 1948), American basketball player
- Jeff Webb (entrepreneur) (1949–2026), American entrepreneur and publisher of Human Events

== See also ==
- Geoffrey Webb (disambiguation)
- Jeffrey Webb (disambiguation)
