= Alan Webb =

Alan Webb may refer to:

- Alan Webb (actor) (1906–1982), English actor
- Alan Webb (runner) (born 1983), American track athlete
- Alan Webb (footballer) (born 1963), retired English association football player

== See also ==
- Allan Webb (disambiguation)
