= Peter Webb =

Peter Webb may refer to:

- Peter Webb (rugby union) (1854–1920), New Zealand rugby union player
- Peter Webb (Irish cricketer) (born 1932), Irish cricketer
- Peter Webb (art dealer) (1933–2019), New Zealand art dealer
- Peter Webb (rower) (born 1940), British rower
- Peter Webb (politician) (born 1953), Australian politician
- Peter Webb (New Zealand cricketer) (born 1957), New Zealand cricketer
