= Alex Webb =

Alex Webb may refer to:

- Alex Webb (musician) (born 1961), British songwriter, musician and former journalist
- Alex Webb (photographer) (born 1952), American photojournalist

== See also ==
- Alexander Webb (disambiguation)
