= Simon Webb =

Simon Webb may refer to:

- Simon Webb (chess player) (1949–2005), British chess player
- Simon Webb (footballer) (born 1978), Irish footballer
- Simon Webb (civil servant) (born 1951), British policy director of the Ministry of Defence
- Simon Webb (cricketer) (born 1981), former English cricketer

== See also ==
- Simon Webbe (born 1978), British singer
