= Berry Webb =

Australian cricketer

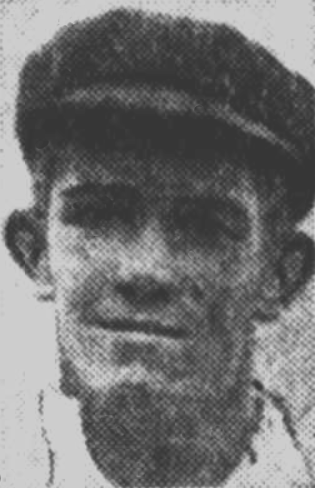

Personal information
- Born: 15 April 1915; Brisbane, Queensland, Australia
- Died: 7 February 1983 (aged 67); Brisbane, Queensland, Australia
- Source: Cricinfo, 8 October 2020

Berry Webb (15 April 1915 – 7 February 1983) was an Australian cricketer. He played in one first-class match for Queensland in 1937/38. He was also a member of the Ascot national code team.

== See also ==
- List of Queensland first-class cricketers
