= Glenn F. Webb =

Glenn F. Webb is a mathematician based in Vanderbilt University. His research interests include mathematical biology and the use of differential equations to model population dynamics and tumor growth.

Webb received his Ph.D. from Emory University in 1968.

In 2012, Webb became a fellow of the American Mathematical Society.
