= Nathaniel Webb =

Nathaniel Webb may refer to:

- Nathaniel Jarrett Webb (1891–1943), American politician in the Virginia House of Delegates
- Nathaniel Webb (MP) (1725–1786), West Indies plantation owner and British politician
