= Stephen Webb =

Stephen Webb is the name of:

- Stephen H. Webb (1961–2016), American theologian
- Stephen P. Webb (born 1946), former mayor of Beverly Hills, California
- Stephen Palfrey Webb (1804–1879), sixth Mayor of San Francisco, California; third and twelfth Mayor of Salem, Massachusetts
- Stephen A. Webb (born 1956), British academic and researcher
- Stephen Webb (scientist), British academic and scientist
- Steve Webb (ice hockey) (born 1975), National Hockey League player
- Stephen Webb (TV personality) (born 1971), English television personality

== See also ==
- Steven Webb (born 1984), British actor
- Steve Webb (disambiguation)
