= Richard Webb =

Richard or Dick Webb may refer to:

- Richard Webb (settler) (1580–1665), founding settler of Hartford and Norwalk, Connecticut
- Richard D. Webb (1805–1872), Irish publisher and abolitionist
- Sir Richard Webb (Royal Navy officer) (1870–1950), British admiral
- Sir Richard Webb (New Zealand Army officer) (1919–1990), New Zealand general
- Richard Webb (actor) (1915–1993), American film, television and radio actor
- Richard A. Webb (1946–2016), American physicist
- Richard Webb (cricketer) (born 1952), New Zealand cricketer
- Dick Webb (actor), British actor
- Dick Webb (rugby) (born 1940), Australian rugby union and rugby league player
