= General Webb =

General Webb may refer to:

- Alexander S. Webb (1835–1911), Union general in the American Civil War
- Daniel Webb (British Army officer) (died 1771), British Army general famous for his actions during the French and Indian War
- James Watson Webb (1802–1884), United States army general, diplomat, newspaper publisher and a New York politician
- John Richmond Webb (1667–1724), English military leader and Member of Parliament
- Marshall B. Webb (born 1961), U.S. Air Force lieutenant general
- Richard Webb (New Zealand Army officer) (1919–1990), New Zealand Army lieutenant general

== See also ==
- Evelyn Webb-Carter (born 1946), British Army major general
- Tom Webb-Bowen (1879–1956), British Army brigadier general and later Royal Air Force vice air marshall
- Attorney General Webb (disambiguation)
