= Kenneth Webb =

Kenneth Webb may refer to:

- Kenneth Webb (director)
- Kenneth Webb (artist)
- Kenneth Webb (cricketer)
- Ken Webb, English cyclist
