= Geoffrey Webb (disambiguation) =

Geoffrey Webb (1898–1970) was a British art historian.

Geoffrey or Geoff Webb may also refer to:

- Geoffrey Webb (artist) (1879–1954), English stained-glass artist
- Geoffrey Webb (cricketer) (1896–1981), English cricketer
- Geoff Webb (born 1960), Australian computer scientist
- Geoffrey Webb, scriptwriter and collaborator of Edward J. Mason
- Geoff Webb, character in the Australian soap opera Home and Away

== See also ==
- Jeff Webb (disambiguation)
