= Kevin Webb (rugby league) =

Australian rugby league player

Personal information
- Born: 26 June 1955 (age 70)

Playing information
- Position: Hooker
Club
Years	Team	Pld	T	G	FG	P
1975-81	Parramatta	19	3	0	0	9
1982	Eastern Suburbs	4	3	0	0	9
	Total	23	6	0	0	18

Kevin Webb (born 26 June 1955) is an Australian former professional rugby league footballer, who played for Parramatta and Eastern Suburbs of the New South Wales Rugby League Premiership (NSWRFL).

== Playing career ==
Webb made his NSWRL debut in the final regular season round of the 1975 season. He played in the rest of Parramatta's finals games, with the club advancing to the minor semi finals - where they would lose to the Manly-Warringah Sea Eagles. Webb did not play in 1976. Webb made only one appearance in 1977 against Newtown and did not play in the 1978 regular season, however he made an appearance in Parramatta's 11-17 loss to Manly-Warringah in the minor semi finals.

In 1979, Webb was promoted to a starting role at hooker and played substantially more games. In round 18, he scored the first try of his career in Parramatta's 22-19 win against the Penrith Panthers. He scored another try in the following round in a blowout 41-3 win against the North Sydney Bears. In the final round of the season, Webb scored a try to help Parramatta win their 8th game in the last 9 games. The Eels finished second on the ladder, behind only the St. George Dragons. Webb played in the minor semi-finals and major semi-finals. Parramatta lost the major semi finals and also lost the preliminary final to the eventual runners up of the competition, the Canterbury-Bankstown Bulldogs.

Webb did not make an appearance in 1980, but would return in 1981 to play one game with Parramatta. His round 1 appearance against Newtown was his final first grade game with the club, as he played reserve grade for the Eels for the rest of the year. The Eels won their inaugural premiership after defeating Newtown 20-11. Webb did not play in the grand final.

After Webb played reserve grade for Parramatta in 1981, he signed with the Roosters for the 1982 season. He was promoted along with Robert Cowie to Eastern Suburbs' first grade, due to Russell Gartner and Ian Barkley being dropped to reserve grade. On the Roosters, Webb found instant success, scoring a try on debut with the club in a round 5 to Penrith. He made 3 more appearances for the team, scoring tries in round 12 and 13 against the Sea Eagles and Canberra Raiders respectively. Round 13 was the final game of Webb's career.

He concluded his career with 6 tries (18 points) in 23 games.
