= Thomas Llewelyn Webb =

English psychologist (born 1978)

- Born: 3 June 1978 (age 48)
- Education: University of Sheffield; University of Bristol
- Scientific career
- Fields: Psychology
- Workplaces: University of Sheffield

Thomas Llewelyn Webb is a professor of psychology at the University of Sheffield in the UK. He is a social psychologist whose interests include motivation, goal orientation, and emotional self-regulation. His research has shown that making backup plans can reduce the likelihood of risky behavior.

== Education ==
Webb has a BA in psychology from the University of Sheffield, an MSc in Research Methods for Psychology from the University of Bristol, and a PhD from the University of Sheffield. His PhD dissertation, titled Motivational and volitional aspects of self-regulation, was awarded the British Psychological Society Social Section prize for outstanding PhD thesis (2004).
