= Henry W. Webb =

American politician

Henry W. Webb was a political leader in Reconstruction era South Carolina. He was a delegate to the South Carolina Constitutional Convention of 1868 and elected to the South Carolina House of Representatives the same year.

He was a delegate to the South Carolina Constitutional Convention of 1868. He represented Georgetown County, South Carolina. He was a member of the South Carolina House of Representatives. He and a couple of other state legislators were dead by November 1869, and James A. Bowley was elected to replace him as Georgetown representative. He was white.

He was originally from Connecticut then moved to Georgetown around 1866. He had a shop from which he traded goods for rice, then turned his hand to running a hotel. In January 1868 he was accused of assault and battery on a small black boy.
