= Edward Webb =

Edward Webb may refer to:

- Edward Webb (politician) (1779–1839), British politician
- Edward Webb (silversmith) (1666–1718), Colonial American silversmith
- Edward Doran Webb (1864–1931), British architect
- Rake Yohn (born Edward Webb, 1975), American television personality
- Edward Webb and Sons, British seed merchants

== See also ==
- Edmund Webb (disambiguation)
