= Attorney General Webb =

Attorney General Webb may refer to:

- Clifton Webb (politician) (1889–1962), Attorney General of New Zealand
- James Webb (Texas politician) (1792–1856), Attorney General of the Republic of Texas
- Ulysses S. Webb (1864–1947), Attorney General of California

== See also ==
- General Webb (disambiguation)
