= Stan Webb =

Stan Webb may refer to:

- Stan Webb (footballer, born 1906) (1906–1994), English footballer
- Stan Webb (footballer, born 1947), English footballer
- Stan Webb (guitarist) (born 1946), English guitarist
- Stan Webb (rugby league) (1899–1971), New Zealand rugby league footballer
