= Ben Webb (journalist) =

Canadian journalist (1957–2002)

Benedict Webb (11 July 1957 – 20 November 2002), known as Ben Webb, was a Canadian journalist best known as editor of Sanity, the Campaign for Nuclear Disarmament monthly. After his death from cancer at 45, Britain's Guardian described him as "one of the mainstays of the left press of the 1980s and 1990s".

Webb was born in British Columbia to a working-class Catholic family. He started in journalism at The Martlet while at the University of Victoria, in British Columbia, during the mid-1970s. At that time, he was also active in Canada's centre-left New Democratic Party. Webb later worked in radio in Quebec and as a correspondent for the Canadian Broadcasting Corporation in Nicaragua during the Sandinista years.

In 1984, he met Laura Jacobs, a British teacher in Managua. They moved to London and married. A son, Jacob, was born in 1986. Webb enrolled in a postgraduate international relations course at the London School of Economics and started writing for the British left press, contributing to numerous publications. He also taught at Middlesex University and the London College of Printing.
