= Steve Webb (medical physicist) =

British physicist

- Born: Steven Webb
- Awards: EFOMP Medal, Barclay Medal
- Scientific career
- Fields: Medical physics
- Workplaces: Institute of Cancer Research, Royal Marsden Hospital

Steve Webb (born 26 November 1948) is a British medical physicist and writer. He is an emeritus professor of physics at the Joint Department of Physics in the Institute of Cancer Research and the Royal Marsden Hospital. He was editor-in-chief of Physics in Medicine and Biology for six years, being succeeded in 2011 by Simon Cherry.

== Biography ==
Steve Webb was born and grew up at Swindon in Wiltshire. He studied at Imperial College London, where he was awarded a BSc degree in 1970 and a PhD degree in 1973. The subject of his doctoral studies was cosmic-ray physics.

Webb's former colleague Robert Speller, who later became head of radiation physics at University College London, had moved into the field of medical physics. This encouraged Webb to consider a career in the same field and, after consultations with his friend, he applied for a job at the Royal Marsden Hospital. Early on he worked in the field of CT. Webb and his colleagues built a CT scanner by cannibalizing a radioisotope scanner. He then moved on to research in nuclear medicine, with one of the hospital's first PET scanners (named MUPPET) housed in a freight container on a lorry in the car park.

Arguably, Webb's most important work was on radiation therapy and included treatment planning and intensity-modulated and image-guided radiotherapies. In 1989 Webb published an important paper on radiotherapy treatment planning (Phys. Med. Biol. 34 1349) and went on to publish more than 150 papers on radiotherapy.

In 1996 Webb was granted a professorship at the Royal Marsden and two years later he became head of the Joint Department of Physics. As Editor-in-Chief of the journal Physics in Medicine and Biology, Webb has been the journal's most published author.

Webb retired in September 2011.

== Honors and awards ==
Webb has been awarded the EFOMP Medal by the European Federation of Organisations for Medical Physics, the Barclay Medal by the British Institute of Radiology, an Honorary Fellowship of the Institute of Physics and Engineering in Medicine, and honorary membership in the Deutsche Gesellschaft für Medizinische Physik e.V., the German Society for Medical Physics. In addition, he was awarded the degree of DSc (Med) Honoris Causa by the University of London.

== Selected publications ==
- Webb, Steve (2015). Intensity-Modulated Radiation Therapy. CRC Press. ISBN 9781420034110.
- Webb, Steve (2009). "The contribution, history, impact and future of physics in medicine". Acta Oncologica. 48 (2): 169–177. doi:10.1080/02841860802244158. PMID 18766998. S2CID 25179082.
- Webb, Steve (2003). "The physical basis of IMRT and inverse planning". The British Journal of Radiology. 76 (910): 678–689. doi:10.1259/bjr/65676879. PMID 14512327.
- Webb, Steve (1989). "Optimisation of conformal radiotherapy dose distribution by simulated annealing". Physics in Medicine and Biology. 34 (10): 1349–1370. Bibcode:1989PMB....34.1349W. doi:10.1088/0031-9155/34/10/002. PMID 2682694. S2CID 250749172.
