= Thomas and Mary Webb House =

Historic house in Utah, United States

- U.S. National Register of Historic Places
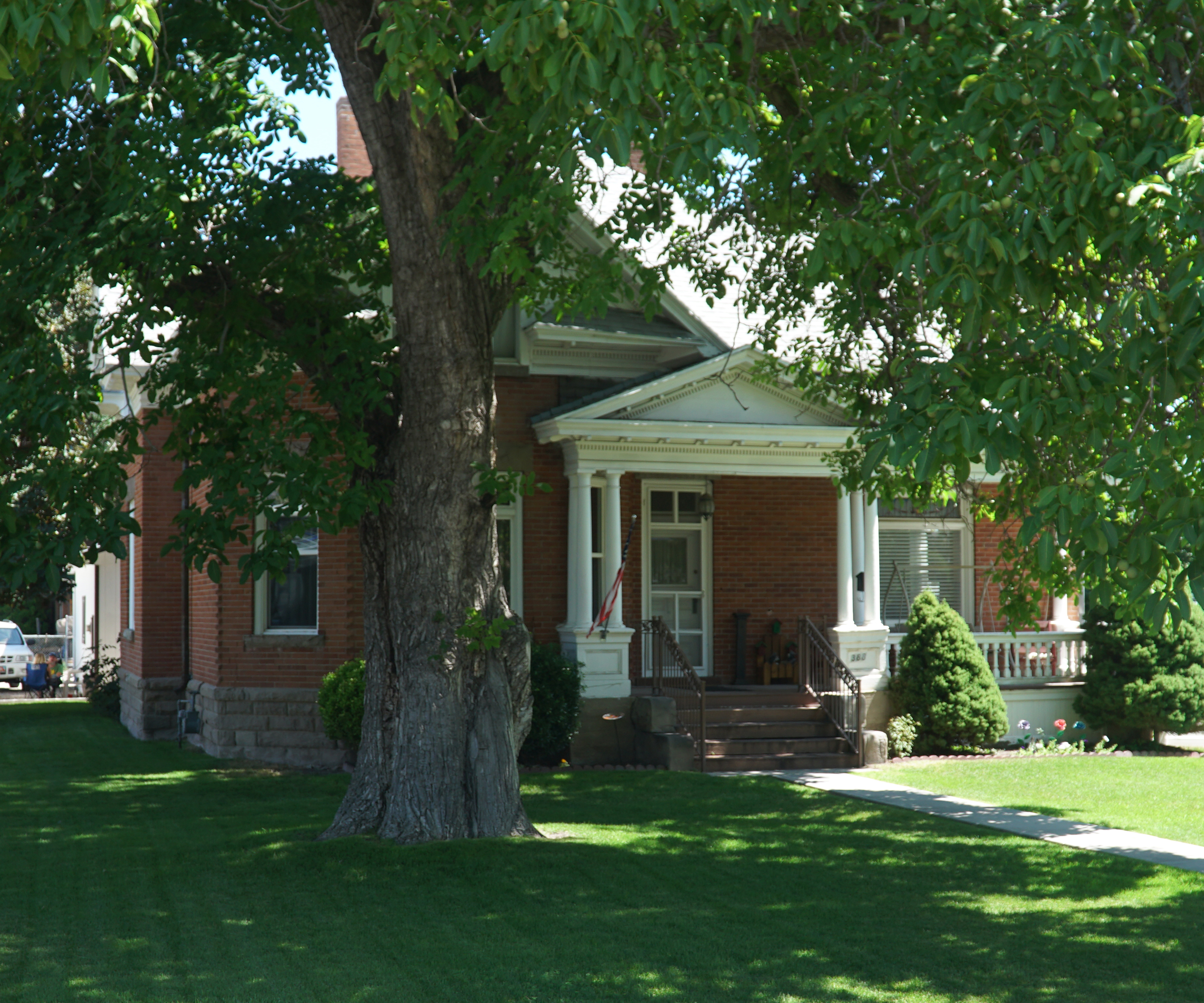
- Thomas and Mary Webb House, August 2019

- Location within Utah Location within the United States
- Location: 388 North 200 East; Lehi, Utah; United States
- Coordinates: 40°23′33″N 111°50′42″W
- Area: less than one acre
- Built: 1903
- Architectural style: Late Victorian, Classical Revival
- MPS: Lehi, Utah MPS
- NRHP reference No.: 98001451
- Added to NRHP: December 4, 1998

The Thomas and Mary Webb House, is a historic residence in Lehi, Utah, United States, that is listed on the National Register of Historic Places (NRHP).

== Description ==
The house is located at 388 North 200 East and was built in 1903. It was built in 1903: its walls were constructed out of fired brick.

The Webbs were a successful local family. Thomas was Mayor of Lehi from 1905 to 1909. His father George, who bought the house plot in 1894, was the owner and editor of the Lehi Banner, the local newspaper. Thomas and Mary married in Salt Lake City in 1882 and raised three children in the Lehi house, which remained their family home throughout their lives.

It was listed on the NRHP December 4, 1998.

== See also ==
- National Register of Historic Places listings in Utah County, Utah
