= Donald Webb =

Donald Webb may refer to:

- Don Webb (writer) (born 1960), American science fiction writer
- Don Webb (American football) (born 1939), former American football defensive back
- Don Webb (playwright) (1934–2024), British playwright and scriptwriter
- Don Webb (diver) (born c. 1933), Canadian former diver and diving coach
- Donald Eugene Webb (1931–1999), American fugitive
