= Judith Webb =

British Army major

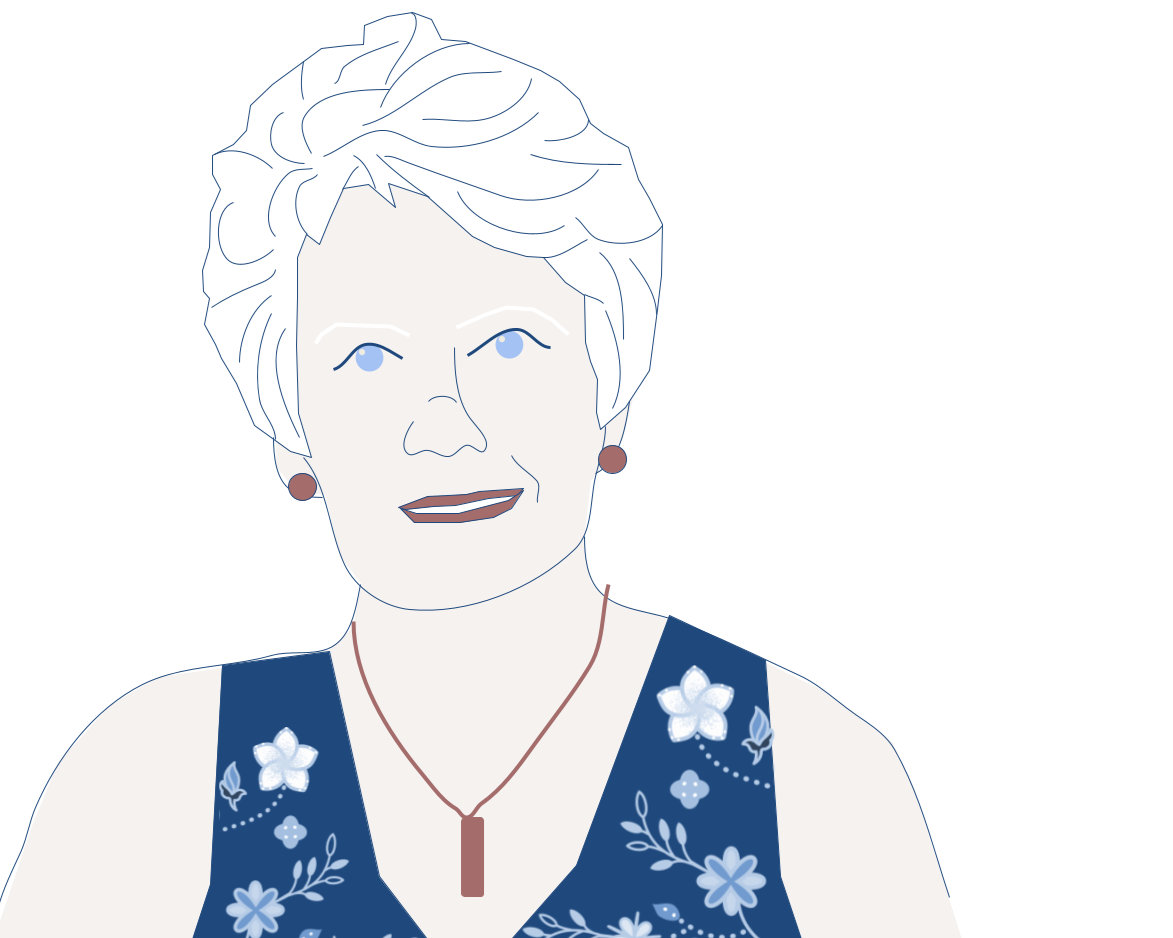
- Occupations: British Army Major; Teacher
- Years active: ?–1986 (Army); 1986–2005 (teacher)

Judith Webb is a former Major in the British Army and a proponent of equal physical standards for male and female service members. She appeared on the BBC 100 Women list for 2013 and 2014. She was the first woman to command an otherwise all-male squadron of the British Army.

== Army career ==
Webb served in the 28th Signal Regiment of the British Army and served in Germany and Cyprus. She was the first woman to command an all-male squadron. She retired from the Army in 1986. In 2013 and 2014, Webb argued against women being allowed into British Army combat infantry units, as she argued that women needed to meet the same physical fitness levels as men, despite being "different physiologically". She was critical of changes in recruitment standards that reduced the difficulty for both men and women, saying it was an attempt to "meet gender equality requirements". She also highlighted as evidence two women who failed to qualify in the United States Marine Corps.

== Personal life ==
Webb and her family ran Rossholme Girls' School, a private girls' school in East Brent, Somerset, for almost 60 years. Webb ran the school from 1986 until 2005, when she closed it down because it was too small to be viable and could not be expanded. The premises were converted for use as holiday accommodation. Webb was included on the BBC 100 Women list for 2013, and 2014, and through that met Kenyan Joyce Aruga, who hoped to set up a school in a Nairobi slum. Webb offered her a supply of school uniforms left over from Rossholme Schoo, and went on to fun-raise to support the school, which is named the Rossholme Education Centre.
