= Wilfred Webb =

Wilfred Webb may refer to:

- Wilfred T. Webb (1864–1938), American politician in the Arizona Territorial Legislature
- Wilfred D. Webb (1921–2016), American educator and politician in the Michigan House of Representatives
