= Judge Webb =

Judge Webb may refer to:

- Edwin Y. Webb (1872–1955), judge of the United States District Court for the Western District of North Carolina
- George Webb (judge) (1828–1891), judge of the Supreme Court of Victoria
- John Richmond Webb (judge) (1721–1766), Welsh judge
- Nathan Webb (judge) (1825–1902), judge of the United States District Court for the District of Maine
- Rodney Scott Webb (1935–2009), judge of the United States District Court for the District of North Dakota
- Thomas Webb (judge) (1845–1916), Australian judge of the equity side of the Supreme Court of Victoria

== See also ==
- Justice Webb (disambiguation)
