= Thomas Webb (engraver) =

English coin and medal engraver

Thomas Webb (1797 - 1822) was an English coin and medal engraver. He is associated with the Royal Birmingham Society of Artists.

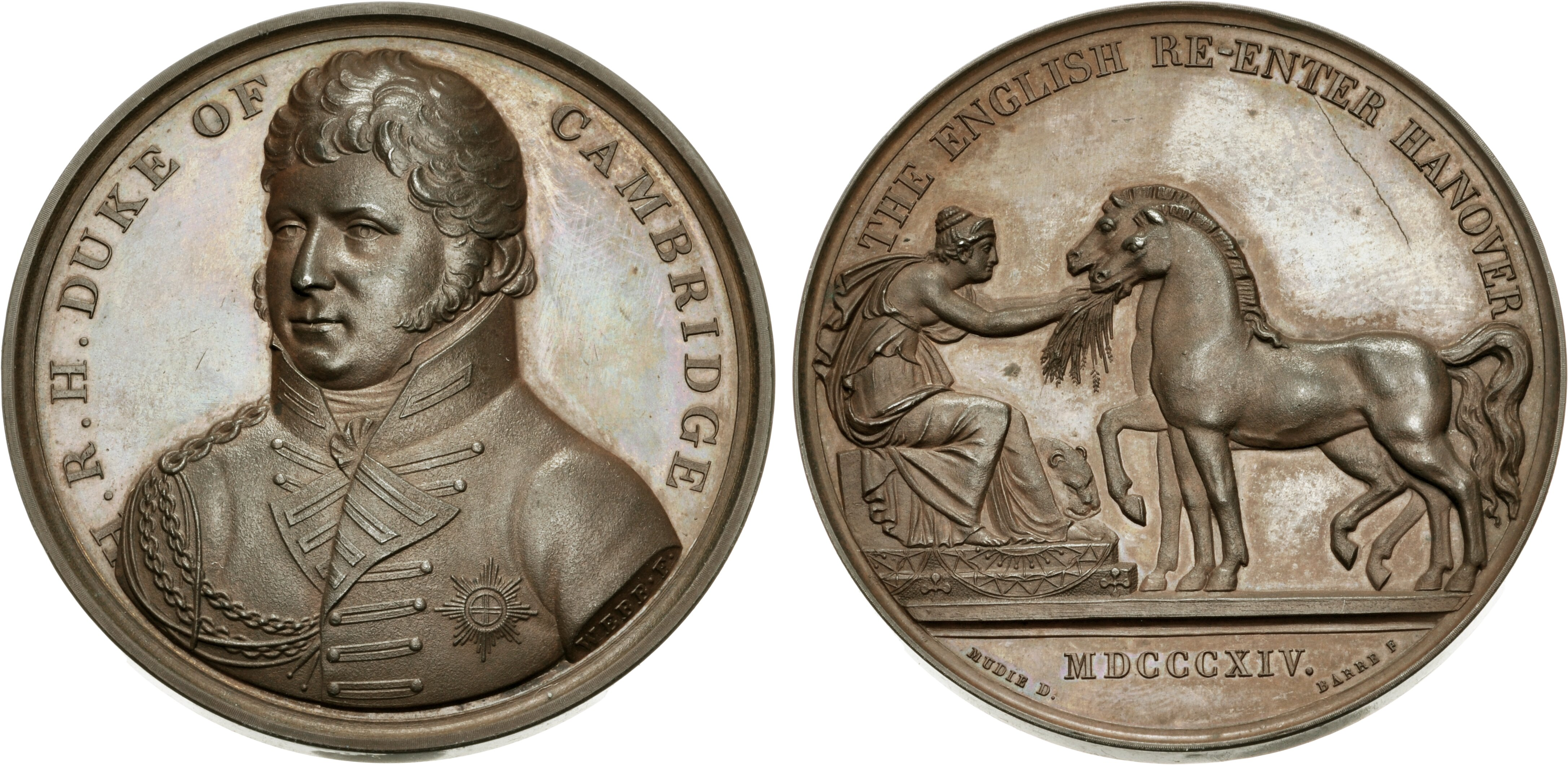
Bronce medal depicting Prince Adolphus, Duke of Cambridge and „The English re-enter Hanover“, 1814

Webb worked for the noted metal producer, Sir Edward Thomason (1769-1849).
