= Leonard Webb =

Leonard Webb may refer to:

- Leonard Webb (academic) (1920–2004), Australian ecologist and ethnobotanist
- Leonard Webb (veteran) (1921–2011), British World War II veteran
