= Noel Webb =

Noel Webb may refer to:

- Noel Webb (musician), American jazz violinist, composer and actor
- Noel Webb (RFC officer) (1896–1917), British World War I flying ace
