= Geoffrey Webb (cricketer) =

English cricketer and naval officer

Arthur Geoffrey Gascoyne Webb (17 August 1896 – 6 April 1981) was an English naval officer, and a cricketer, active from 1919 to 1938 who played for Leicestershire. He was also an amateur artist.

== Life ==
Webb was born in Kent, at Sittingbourne or Newington, Swale, and was educated at Wellington College. He joined the Royal Navy in 1914, and served during World War I, being present during the battle of Jutland, and reaching the rank of lieutenant in September 1918.

Appearing first for a Royal Navy eleven, Webb played in five first-class matches. He was a lefthanded batsman who kept wicket. He scored 123 runs with a highest score of 57 and completed one catch with five stumpings.

Webb remained in the navy until 1923 and the Geddes Axe. He then worked as a schoolmaster, teaching cricket. He was a colonial education officer in Nigeria. There he became an authority on the Hausa language and customs, and wrote a book and examination text, Al'adun Hausawa (1932) with Frank William Taylor (born 1887), in charge of education at Yola, Adamawa.

During World War II, Webb was again a Royal Navy officer, becoming lieutenant-commander. He was involved as Secretary in Leicestershire County Cricket Club, and administratively in King George's Fund for Sailors. He painted in East Anglia, and exhibited.

== Personal life ==
Webb married Audrey Haggard, a niece of Rider Haggard, but she died in Nigeria in the early 1930s. He married Iris Thompson in 1935.

Webb died in Oakham, at the age of eighty-four.

== Works ==
- Webb, Arthur Geoffrey Gascoyne (2008). Five Years in the White Man's Grave: An Education Officer in Nigeria, 1928-33. Legini Press.
