= Allan Webb =

Allan Webb may refer to:

- Allan Webb (bishop)
- Allan Webb (American football)

== See also ==
- Alan Webb (disambiguation)
