= Mojo Webb =

Australian musician

Michael Robert "Mojo" Webb is a multi-instrumentalist blues musician, based in Brisbane, Australia. On 8 February 2007, Mojo Webb was awarded the Australian Blues Music Chain Award for 'New Talent of the Year'.

== Music ==
Mojo Webb's music is traditional, guitar-based blues which is reminiscent of the Chicago and delta style artists such as Muddy Waters, B. B. King, Howlin' Wolf, Buddy Guy and Robert Johnson.

2006 saw the release of The Burden, his debut album, with all fourteen songs written by Mojo Webb. The debut album was particularly significant as Mojo Webb recorded all vocals and also played all the instruments including guitar, bass guitar, drums, harmonica, and saxophone. Mojo Webb also wrote, arranged, recorded, mixed, and produced the entire album.

In January 2012, Mojo Webb released the long-awaited follow-up album titled, The Cat. With thirteen all new original songs as recorded and performed by the band – Mojo Webb (Lead guitar/Vocals), JB Lewis (Bass guitar/Guitar on "Hot Dog") and Coojee Timms (Drums/Backing Vocals). The album was recorded in December 2011 as preparation for the bands assault on the 2012 International Blues Challenge in Memphis.

The Mojo Webb Band qualified for the IBC after winning the BASEQ (Blues Association of South East Queensland) Memphis Blues Challenge. The band reached the semi-final stage of the IBC.

Mojo Webb plays both solo and with his own three-piece band in and around Brisbane, on tours throughout Queensland and interstate together with major festivals throughout Australia, including Bluesfest Byron Bay, Blues on Broadbeach, Sydney Blues And Roots Festival Windsor, Australian Blues Music Festival Goulburn, Winter Blues Echuca and in northern Thailand.

Mojo Webb is renowned for his dynamic guitar and keyboard solo leads and often swaps lead with J.B.Lewis through his repertoire.

The Mojo Webb Band members include Mojo Webb (Lead Vocal/Lead Guitar/Harmonica), J.B.Lewis (Bass/Lead/Rhythm guitars), Coojee Timms (Drums/Backing Vocals) and Jason Chandler (Bass guitar).

Other music/band projects have in recent years included a new band known as The Evening Sons has Mojo Webb (Lead Guitar) with Greg Baker (Lead Vocal/Harmonica) and Coojee Timms (Drums).

In addition, recent reformations have surfaced of one of the original and pioneering local Brisbane-based blues bands, Buzz 'N The Blues Band featuring Robert 'Buzz' Oxford (Lead Vocals), Mojo Webb (Lead Guitar), Jason Chandler (Bass Guitar) together with other local/guest musicians including JB Lewis, Peter Robertson, Ric Halstead, Neil Wickham and Devid Bentley.

== Awards ==
On 8 February 2007, Webb was awarded the Australian Blues Music 'Chain' Award for New Talent of the Year. In the same year he was nominated in four other categories including Album, Producer, Male Vocalist and Song of the Year. The annual Australian Blues Music / Chain awards recognise excellence in blues music in Australia in categories including artist, song, band, new talent and production.

=== Australian Blues Music Chain Awards ===
Mojo Webb: Australian Blues Music Awards
Year	Category	Title	Result
2007	New Talent of the Year	The Luckiest Man Alive	Winner
2007	Album of the Year	The Burden	Nominee
2007	Song of the Year	A Man Like Me	Nominee
2007	Producer of the Year	The Burden	Nominee
2007	Male Vocalist of the Year	Got You on My Mind	Nominee

=== Bluestar Awards ===
In 2007 Mojo Webb was awarded three Bluestar awards for the People's Choice Best Australasian Solo Artist, Best Australasian Instrumentalist – Acoustic Guitar, and Industry Choice – Best Australian CD Release – Solo (The Burden.)

=== BASEQ Memphis Blues Challenge 2011 ===
In August 2011 the Mojo Webb Band won the BASEQ (Blues Association of South East Queensland) Memphis Blues Challenge held in Brisbane, Qld. This allowed the band to compete in the 2012 International Blues Challenge held annually in Memphis Tennessee USA in late January/early February.

=== Get Shot Magazine Best Performer Sydney Blues And Roots Festival Award 2012 ===
October 2012 saw the Mojo Webb Band perform for the first time at the third Annual Sydney Blues And Roots Festival.

Four judges independently allocated a score to the performers they saw on specific criteria.

The judges from a sphere of experienced Australian radio, media, entertainment and the music industry had the freedom to select which acts they chose to watch out of the 80 plus acts and 130 performances over four days of entertainment. The inaugural Get Shot Magazine SBRF Award 2012 was made after measuring each act on a series of criteria and allocating a score based on audience engagement, musicianship, professionalism, entertainment amongst six other key areas.

2012 also saw the Mojo Webb Band perform with internationally acclaimed Queen of Beale Street blues, Barbara Blue on an East Coast Australian tour.

=== 2012 International Blues Challenge Memphis USA ===
Following the first two rounds of the competition, the Mojo Webb Band achieved a semi-final position result that held the band amongst the top final 44 international blues bands competing in the world.

=== The Evening Sons ===
Founded in 2015 Mojo Webb brought together Greg Baker and Coojee Timms to form The Evening Sons, an authentic, vintage-style blues trio, bringing 1951 alive again and recorded a studio at Varsarsy Palace Studio (Brisbane, Qld) in October 2018, The Woodford Boogie. This album coincided with their sensational sets at the Woodford Folk Festival, an annual music festival held in late December to early January, the largest gathering of musicians in Australia in Woodford, approximately 72 km north of Brisbane, Queensland.

== Discography ==
Studio albums: Mojo Webb:

- The Burden (2006)
- The Cat (2012)

The Evening Sons: Mojo Webb (Vocals/Guitar), Greg Baker (Vocals/Harmonica/Guitar), Coojee Timms (Drums/Percussion/Shouting)

- The Woodford Boogie (2018)
