= Wally Webb =

Australian rugby league footballer

Walter Webb
Personal information
- Born: 6 March 1885
- Died: 31 December 1956 (aged 71) Kingsford, New South Wales, Australia

Playing information
Club
Years	Team	Pld	T	G	FG	P
1909	Eastern Suburbs	7	2	0	0	6
- Source: As of 5 December 2024
- Known for: Horse trainer
- Relatives: Ray Stehr (son-in-law)

Walter William Webb (1885–1956) was a rugby league footballer in the Australian competition the New South Wales Rugby League.

== Biography ==
Wally Webb played for the Eastern Suburbs club in the 1909 season but it better remembered as a leading administrator of the club. He also represented New South Wales in 1909.

The father-in-law of Eastern suburbs legend Ray Stehr, Wally Webb was one of that club's earliest secretaries. Webb was awarded life membership of the Eastern Suburbs Roosters club and was president of the club for many years.

He was also a noted Horse trainer, winning the Ascot Cup with Greyfoot in 1928.

Wally Webb was team manager of the 1933/34 Kangaroos, working closely with Harry Sunderland.

== Death ==
He died at Kingsford, New South Wales on New Year's Eve 1956.
