= Chris Webb (sculptor) =

British sculptor of Portland stone

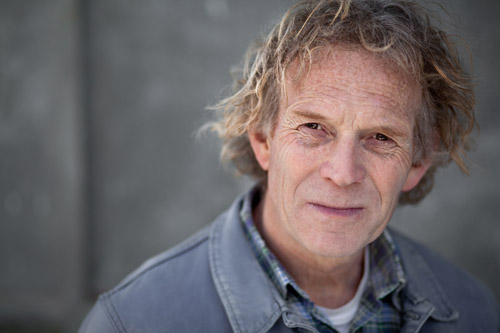
Publicity photo of Master Sculptor Chris Webb 2011

Chris Webb is a British sculptor of Portland stone. Originally a blacksmith, with work featured throughout London, Webb moved his attention to stone and has over 30 years experience in this medium.

Webb is a member of Rye Arts Club. He divides his time between his two studios in Somerset, England and the south of France.

Webb's most recent work includes the Kingfisher's Nest for Somerset Square, Taunton, England.
