= Benjamin Joseph Webb =

American politician

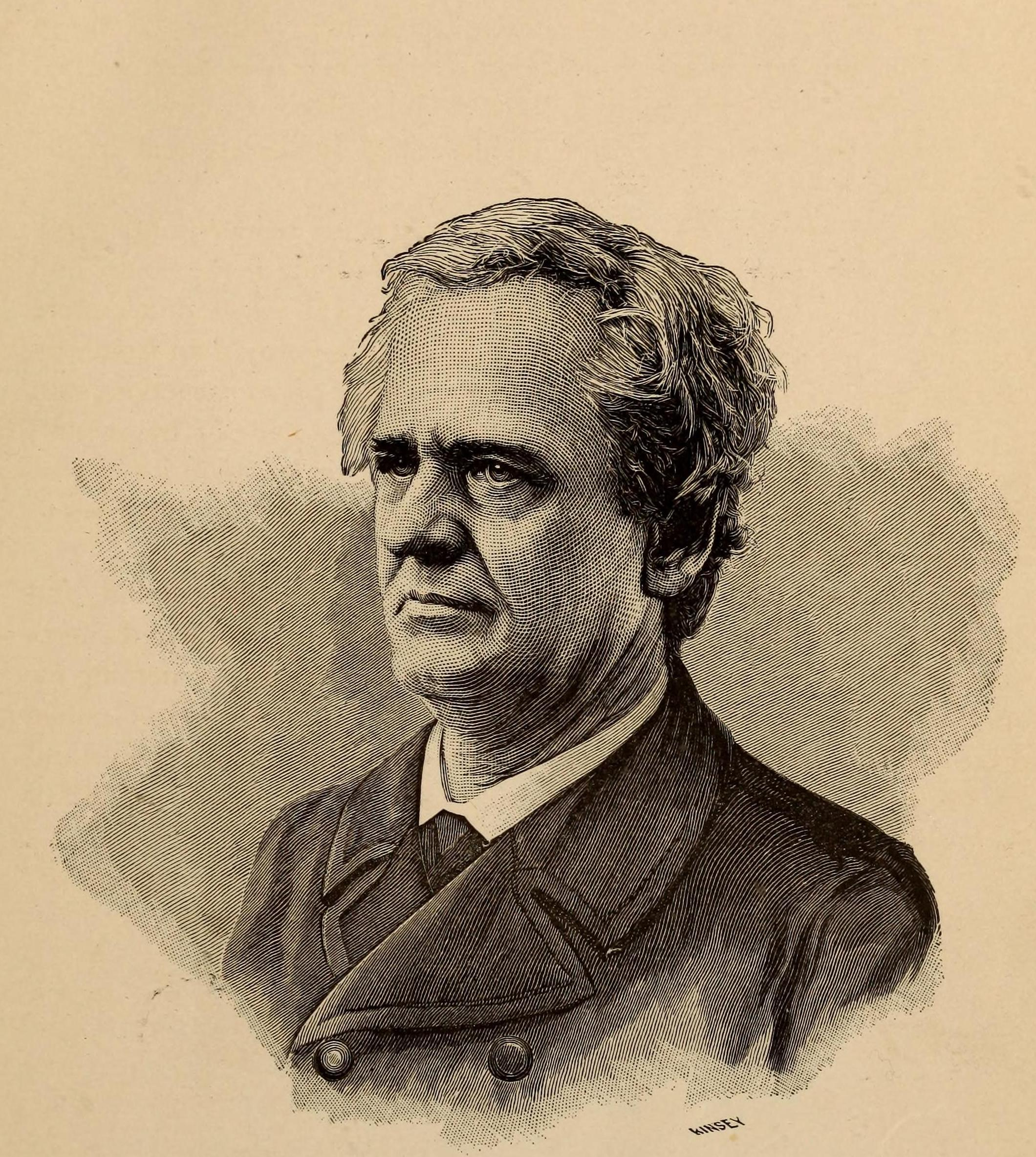

Senator, Kentucky Senate
- In office 1867–1875

Personal details
- Born: February 25, 1814
- Died: August 2, 1897 (aged 83)

Benjamin Joseph Webb (aka Benedict Joseph Webb; February 25, 1814 – August 2, 1897) was a Catholic editor, state senator for Kentucky, and historian.

Webb was born in Bardstown, Kentucky, to a father who was a 1774 pioneer to that state. He was educated at St. Joseph's College in Bardstown, but left at an early age to learn the printer's trade. He took a position as foreman of the office of the Journal, a newspaper in Louisville, Kentucky. It was while he was a foreman in 1836 that Ignatius A. Reynolds (his former teacher and later Bishop of Charleston, South Carolina) persuaded him to head the Bardstown publication the Catholic Advocate. Webb accepted the assignment and worked along with Bishops Spalding, David, and Benedict Joseph Flaget. Webb moved the office of the Catholic Advocate to Louisville in 1841, and in 1847 he retired from its management. He continued to defend Catholic interests, notably in connection with George D. Prentice, editor of the Louisville Journal in 1855. In a series of letters he attacked the intolerance and disgrace of the Know-Nothing movement; these letters were subsequently printed in book form with the title "Letters of a Kentucky Catholic". On May 1, 1858, with further assistance from Bishop Spalding and in connection with other members of the Particular Council of the St. Vincent de Paul Society of Louisville, he issued the Catholic Guardian, production ended in July 1862 by the ongoing American Civil War. On the revival of the paper in 1869, he again contributed to it. He served as a member of the Kentucky State Senate from 1867 to 1875, and in 1868 wrote the memoirs of Governors Lazarus W. Powell and John L. Helm. His association with Catholic interests in Kentucky led him to compile The Centenary of Catholicity in Kentucky in 1884, a volume cataloging the persons and times of Kentucky's pioneering era. Webb died in Louisville on August 2, 1897.
