= Tony Webb =

English social scientist (born 1945)

Dr Tony Webb (born 1945) is an English social scientist and former academic residing in Australia. He is the co-author of several books including Radiation : your health at risk (1980), Food irradiation: The facts (1987) which he wrote with Tim Lang and Radiation and your health (1988). In 1988, Webb toured Australia with Friends of the Earth, speaking in opposition to the irradiation of food.

He currently resides in South Australia, where he was a member of the Citizens' Jury formed to consider the findings of the Nuclear Fuel Cycle Royal Commission in 2016. He stood as the Labor party's candidate in the electoral district of Heysen in the 2018 South Australian General Election but was unsuccessful.
