= Colin Webb (cricketer) =

Australian cricketer

Personal information
- Full name: Colin Ralph Webb
- Born: 20 January 1926; Adelaide, Australia
- Died: 3 May 2015 (aged 89)
- Batting: Right-handed

Domestic team information
- Years: Team
- 1945–46: South Australia

Career statistics
Competition	FC
Matches	6
Runs scored	202
Batting average	20.20
100s/50s	0/1
Top score	63
Catches/stumpings	3/–
- Source: Cricinfo, 29 September 2020

Colin Ralph Webb (20 January 1926 – 3 May 2015) was an Australian cricketer. He played in six first-class matches for South Australia in 1945–46.

== See also ==
- List of South Australian representative cricketers
