= Kathy Webb =

American politician

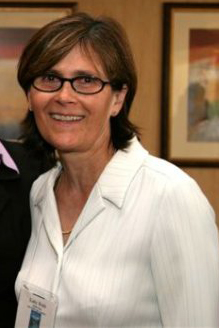
- Webb in 2008

Member of the Arkansas House of Representatives from the 37th district
- In office January 8, 2007 – January 13, 2013
- Preceded by: Sam Ledbetter
- Succeeded by: Eddie Armstrong

Vice Mayor of Little Rock, Arkansas
- In office 2015–2017
- Incumbent
- Assumed office January 2023

Personal details
- Born: 1949 (age 76–77) Blytheville, Arkansas
- Party: Democratic

Kathy Webb (born 1949) is an American restaurateur and politician from Little Rock, Arkansas. A Democrat, she was re-elected and currently serves as Vice Mayor of Ward 3 of Little Rock, and previously served as Vice Mayor of Little Rock from 2015 to 2017. She formerly served in the Arkansas House of Representatives, representing the state's 37th district from January 8, 2007, to January 13, 2013. She was re-elected as Vice Mayor of Little Rock, Arkansas in January 2023 and replacing Ward 5 City Director Lanes Hines.

== Early life, education and career ==
Webb grew up in Arkansas and in sixth grade volunteered for John F. Kennedy's presidential campaign. In 1967, she graduated from Hall High School in Little Rock. Webb went on to earn a B.A. in political science from Randolph-Macon Woman's College and attended graduate school at the University of Central Arkansas. In 2007, Webb completed Harvard University's John F. Kennedy School of Government program for Senior Executives in State and Local Government as a David Bohnett LGBTQ Victory Institute Leadership Fellow. After working full-time in the women's movement for several years, Webb took a job in the hospitality industry. She worked her way up at a large franchisee of Domino's Pizza, then went on to take a position as vice president of a bagel chain in Chicago before starting her own barbecue restaurant. Webb moved to Little Rock in 2002 as co-owner of Lilly's Dim Sum.

== Political career ==
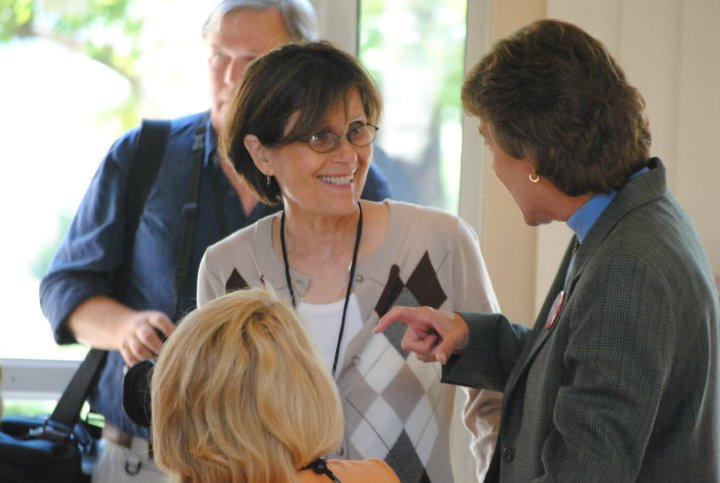
Kathy Webb with U.S. Senator Blanche Lincoln in Little Rock.

After winning a four-way Democratic primary on May 23, 2006, with 57 percent of the vote, Webb was elected without Republican opposition and was sworn into the Arkansas House of Representatives in January 2007. Webb ran unopposed in 2008 & 2010.

In the Arkansas House of Representatives, Webb served as co-chair of the Joint Budget Committee, the first woman to hold that position. Webb also served on the Rules, Education and Facilities Committees, as well as the executive committee of Legislative Council. She served as co-chair of the Governor's Working Group on Public Safety and Corrections, Co-chair of the Sustainable Building and Design Task Force and co-chair of the Governor's Commission on Global Warming.

Due to term limits, Webb was ineligible for re-election in 2012.

In 2014, Webb was elected to represent Ward 3 on the Little Rock City Board.

== Community service and awards ==
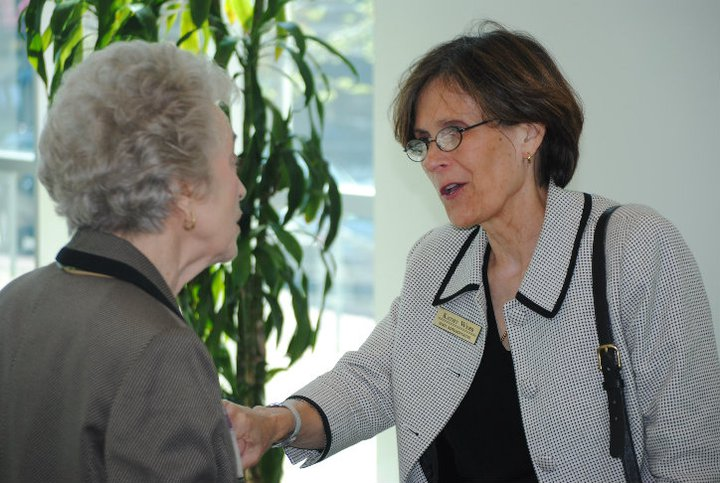
Webb in Little Rock.

Webb serves on the boards of the UAMS College of Medicine Board of Visitors, Arkansas Hospice and FUMCLR Board of Trustees. She is a member of the Missions Committee at FUMCLR and the United Methodist Conference Finance and Administrative Board. Webb is a member of the Pulaski County Democratic Women, Pulaski County Democratic Committee, and the State Democratic Committee. She will serve as a Party Leader delegate to the Democratic National Convention in Charlotte. She co-founded the Legislative Hunger Caucus and was the founding president of the Chicago area affiliate of Susan G. Komen for the Cure.

Webb received the Legend Champion Award from Arkansas Kids Count Coalition, JCA Humanitarian of the Year Award, First Branch Award from the Arkansas Judicial Council and Pioneer Award from the National Association of Women Business Owners. Webb has also been honored by the Sierra Club, Arkansas AIDS Foundation, Arkansas Chapter of the National Association of Social Workers, Pulaski County CASA, Interfaith Alliance for Worker Justice, National WAND/WiLL, Arkansas AARP, Citizens First Congress, Arkansas Hospitality Association and the Municipal League. Webb received the Hendrix College Ethel K. Millar Award for social justice and the Rev. Negail Riley Award from Black Methodists for Social Renewal. In 2012 TALK BUSINESS rated her as the Most Effective Member of the House of Representatives. In September 2023, Webb announces that she will step down as CEO of Arkansas Hunger Alliance on January 31, 2024.

== Personal life ==
A lesbian, Webb was the first openly gay person to serve in the Arkansas General Assembly. She resides in Little Rock where she is executive director of the Arkansas Hunger Relief Alliance. Webb is a 25-year veteran of the hospitality industry, most recently as co-owner of Lilly's Dim Sum, Then Some. She is a member of the First United Methodist Church. The acclaimed singer-songwriter Lucinda Williams is her cousin.
