= Jim Webb (humanitarian) =

Australian humanitarian (1929–2009)

James Bawtree (Jim) Webb, OBE (1929–2009) was an Australian activist and organiser. In 1961, Webb founded the Overseas Service Bureau, which would later become Australian Volunteers International, to encourage and support Australian international volunteers.

Webb served as the bureau's director from 1963 until 1969. From 1970 to 1975, he was director of Community Aid Abroad, which would later become Oxfam Australia. In 1970, he was appointed an Officer of the Order of the British Empire.

== Early life and education ==
Webb was born on 11 May 1929. He was the son of Francis Leslie Bawtree Webb and Anne Gwendolyn Webb. He had an older and a younger sister. Webb grew up in the Melbourne suburb of Hawthorn and attended Spring Road Primary School and Spring Road Central School in Malvern. From 1943 to 1946, he attended Melbourne Boys' High School.

In 1947, Webb completed a term at Melbourne University and, in 1949, he studied accountancy at the Hemmingway Robertson Institute. Webb continued his studies at Melbourne University's Queens College from 1951 until 1954 (graduating with honours). Meanwhile, he became secretary, and later president, of the Melbourne University Student Representative Council.

== Career ==
Webb worked as a paint salesman from 1947 through 1950 and as tutor in political science at the University of Melbourne from 1955 to 1956. He helped establish the Australia-Indonesia Association and was chairman of the Australian Committee for the World University Service. In 1953, he co-founded and became honorary secretary of the Volunteer Graduate Association for Indonesia.

Webb worked as a warden at Union House at Melbourne University from 1956. He resigned from the position in 1962 before finishing up in May 1963.

In 1961, Webb co-founded the Overseas Service Bureau (OSB), which would later become Australian Volunteers International, to encourage and support Australian international volunteers. In 1963, he set up the bureau's Australian Volunteers Abroad Programme. Webb served as the OSB's full-time director from 1964 until 1969. In 1965, he was involved in establishing the Australian Council for Overseas Aid, now Australian Council for International Development, the Australian non-government aid sector’s peak body.

In 1964, Webb went on a tour of African and Asian countries courtesy of a travel grant. In 1967, Webb went on a regional tour of Southeast Asian countries meeting with government officials. 1968, OSB placed more than 200 Australian volunteers overseas.

After leaving the Overseas Service Bureau, Webb became the director of the Social and Cultural Division of the Asian and Pacific Council's (ASPAC) Cultural and Social Centre for the Asia and Pacific Region in Seoul. He served in the position until 1970. From 1970 to 1975, he was director of Community Aid Abroad (now Oxfam Australia).

In 1971, he published "Towards survival: a programme for Australia's overseas aid".

== Personal life ==
Webb married Lesley Merele Hayes in 1956. The couple had two sons and a daughter. In 1984, he married second wife, Marie Scott.

In 1976, Webb was hospitalised with serious depression and later bipolar disorder. In 1997, he was hospitalised with acute goitre, and spent 10 days in intensive care, the start of twelve years of debilitating ill–health.

Webb died on 20 July 2009. He was 80.

== Awards ==
In 1950, Webb learned he had won a United Nations International Essay contest, entitling him to a fellowship to represent Australia at the yearly assemblies of the World Federation of United Nations Associations in Geneva and to study at the UN general assembly in New York. There, he met Eleanor Roosevelt.

In 1952, he received a UNESCO Grant to travel for three months studying aid and development in Asia.

In 1970, Webb was made an Officer of the Order of the British Empire in the Queen's New Years Honours.
