= Anthony Webbe (Missouri politician) =

American politician

Anthony M. Webbe (January 10, 1901 – July 15, 1953) was an American Democratic politician who served in the Missouri General Assembly. He served in the Missouri Senate in the 1940s and in the Missouri House of Representatives in the 1930s.

Born in St. Louis, Missouri, he was educated in parochial and public schools in St. Louis. On February 22, 1930, he married Sophia Kopchala of St. Louis. Anthony M. Webbe died July 15, 1953, at age 52. His wife Sophia Webbe died on Oct 20, 1978, at the age of 69.
