= Edmund F. Webb =

American politician

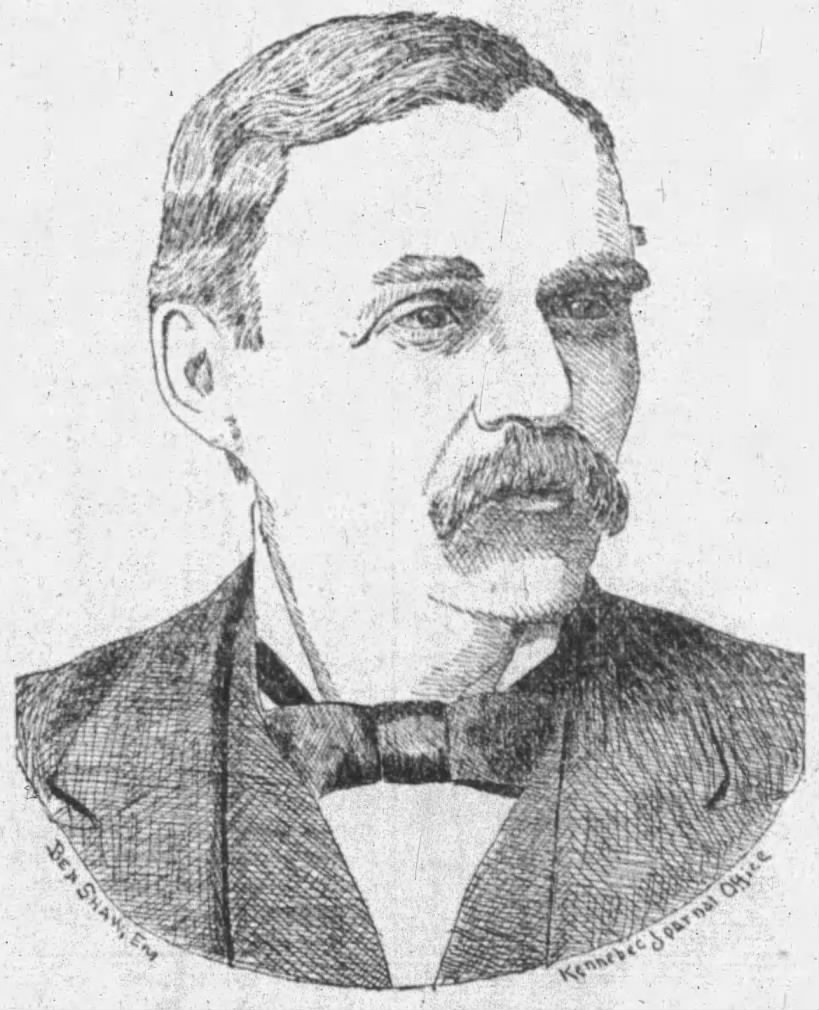
Kennebec Journal, February 24, 1896

Edmund F. Webb (January 30, 1835 – December 7, 1898) was an American politician from Maine. A Republican from Waterville, Maine, Webb served two terms in the Maine House of Representatives (1872, 1873). In his 2nd term, Webb was elected House Speaker. In 1874, he was elected to the Maine Senate. A year later in 1875, he was elected Senate President.

In 1896, Webb served as Mayor of Waterville.
