= Bostwick =

Bostwick may refer to:

== People with the name Bostwick ==
=== Surname ===
- Bostwick family of New York, descended from Jabez A. Bostwick (1830–1892):
  - Albert Carlton Bostwick
    - Albert C. Bostwick, Jr. (1901–1980), steeplechase jockey and racehorse owner
    - Dorothy Stokes Bostwick (1899–2001), American heiress and artist
    - Dunbar Bostwick (1908–2006), American businessman, hockey player, and horseman
    - Lillian Bostwick Phipps (1906–1987), American socialite and racehorse owner
    - Pete Bostwick (1909–1982), American tennis and polo player and jockey
- Arthur Elmore Bostwick (1860–1942), American librarian and author
- Barry Bostwick (born 1945), American actor and singer
- Frank Matteson Bostwick (1857–1945), American flag officer of the U.S. Navy
- Jackson Bostwick (born 1943), American actor
- Janet Bostwick (born 1939), Bahamian lawyer and politician
- John Henry Bostwick (1939–2025), Bahamian politician
- John Bostwick (1780–1849), Canadian surveyor, businessman, and politician
- Michael Bostwick (born 1988), English professional football player
- Sarah Bostwick (born 1979), American visual artist
- Scott Bostwick (1961–2011), American college football coach

=== Given name ===
- Robert Bostwick Carney (1895–1990), American admiral in the United States Navy
- Samuel Bostwick Garvin (1811–1878), American lawyer and politician
- Floyd Bostwick Odlum (1892–1976), American lawyer and industrialist
- William Bostwick Sheppard (1860–1934), United States federal judge

== Places ==
- Bostwick, Florida, United States
- Bostwick, Georgia, United States
- Bostwick, Nebraska, United States
- Bostwick, Ohio, United States

== Other uses ==
- Bostwick (Bladensburg, Maryland), historic house in Maryland; listed on the National Register of Historic Places (NRHP)
- Bostwick Railroad (1907–1912), short-lived railroad in Georgia, U.S.
- Bostwick School, historic school in Bostwick, Florida; listed on the NRHP
- USS Bostwick (DE-103), Cannon-class destroyer escort of the U.S. Navy (1943–1946)

== See also ==
- Bostock (disambiguation)
- "Boswick the Clown", character and identity portrayed by American actor David Magidson
