= Bostwick family =

The Bostwick family are descendants of Robert De Brostick, born in 1522 in England.

A branch of the New York Bostwick family rose to prominence when Jabez Abel Bostwick made a fortune in business and was a founding partner and first Treasurer of the Standard Oil Company.

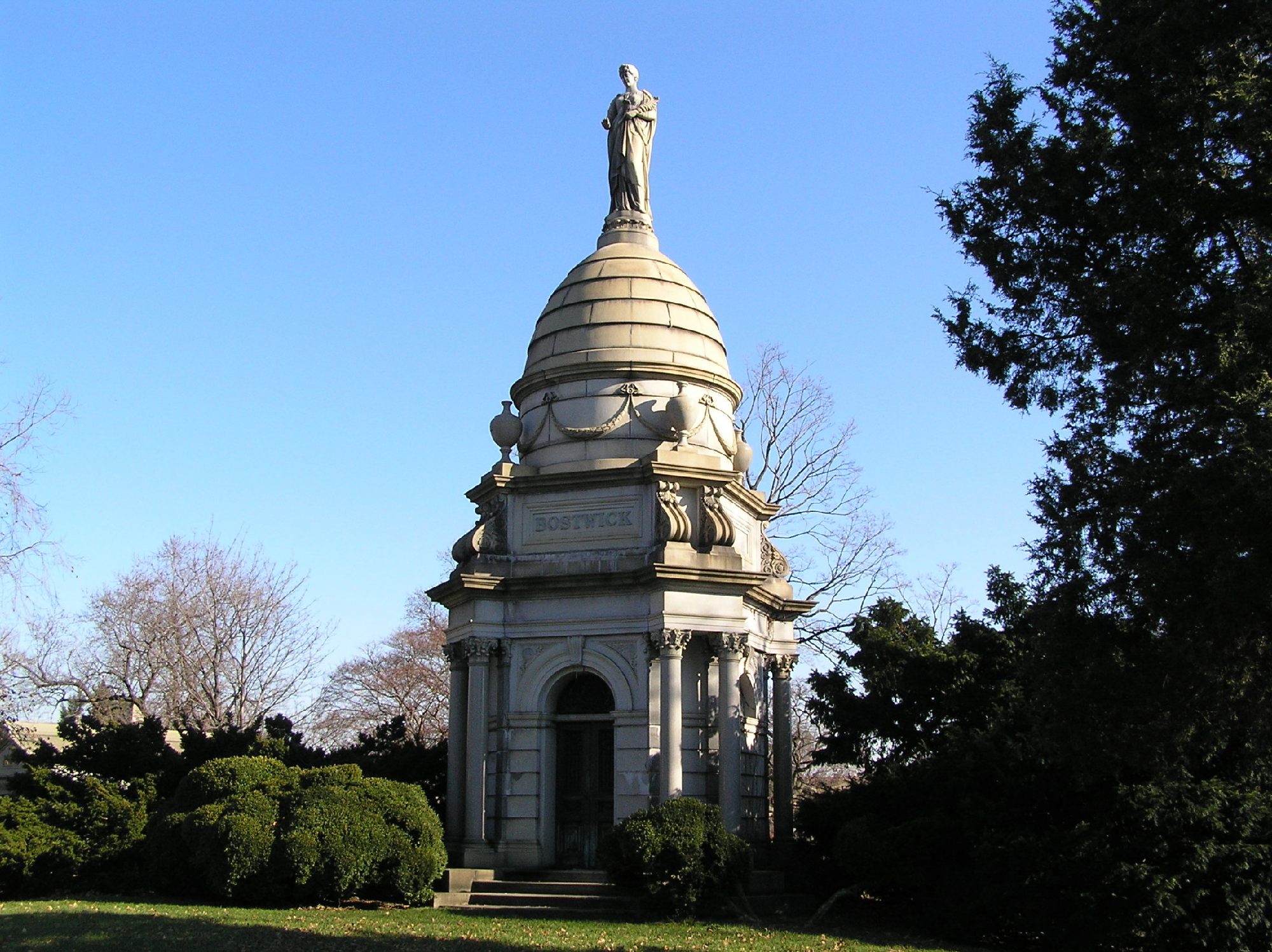
The Bostwick Family Mausoleum in Woodlawn Cemetery

Jabez Bostwick and his wife Helen had two daughters, Nellie and Evelyn, and a son, Albert Carlton Bostwick (1876–1911). Nellie Bostwick married Francis Lee Morrell, a member of the New York Stock Exchange. Their youngest daughter, Evelyn, first married Capt. Albert Carstairs of the Royal Irish Rifles and made her home in London, England. Their daughter, Joe Carstairs, was well known in the 1920s as a powerboat racer who led an eccentric lifestyle.

Albert Carlton Bostwick married Mary Lillian Stokes and had five children:

- Dorothy Stokes (1899–2001) - philanthropist, first woman to hold a helicopter pilot's license
- Albert Jr. (1901–1980) - Thoroughbred racehorse owner and breeder, whose horse Mate won the 1931 Preakness Stakes
- Lillian Stokes (1906–1987) - owner of Thoroughbred steeplechase racehorses, who won the American Grand National eight times
- Dunbar Wright (1908–2006) - chairman of the Aviation Instrument Manufacturing Corp.; Standardbred horse breeder, hockey player and a director and treasurer of the United States Trotting Association.
- George Herbert "Pete" (1909–1982) - Hall of Fame polo player, U.S. Racing Hall of Fame steeplechase jockey and horse trainer

Cornell University is home to the Albert C. Bostwick Laboratory of Molecular Biology: Canine and Feline Parvoviruses at the Baker Institute, College of Veterinary Medicine.

Members of the Bostwick family married into the prominent Clark family, once significant owners of Singer Sewing Machine in Cooperstown, New York.
