= Colin G. Campbell =

American academic administrator (1935–2024)

13th President of Wesleyan University
- In office 1970 – July 31, 1988
- Preceded by: Edwin Etherington
- Succeeded by: William Chace

Personal details
- Born: Colin Goetze Campbell; November 3, 1935 New York
- Died: June 21, 2024 (aged 88) Bluffton, South Carolina
- Spouse: Nancy Nash
- Parent(s): Joseph Campbell; Marjorie Goetze Campbell
- Education: Cornell University; Columbia Law School

Colin Goetze Campbell (November 3, 1935 – June 21, 2024) was an American who served as the thirteenth president of Wesleyan University and the President of the Rockefeller Brothers Fund and the Colonial Williamsburg Foundation.

== Early life ==
He was the son of Joseph Campbell and the former Marjorie Louise Goetze. His father was the 4th comptroller general of the United States and his mother served as president of the board of governors for the Mansfield Training School. His parents divorced and his father remarried to artist and philanthropist Dorothy Stokes Bostwick, the daughter of Albert Carlton Bostwick and granddaughter of Standard Oil founding shareholder, Jabez A. Bostwick.

Campbell attended Cornell University, where he served as the chairman of the Orientation Executive Committee and on the Willard Straight Hall Board of Managers. He was also elected to the Sphinx Head Society in his senior year, before graduating in 1957. Campbell went on to earn a law degree from Columbia Law School in 1961.

== Career ==
Campbell worked at the American Stock Exchange prior to becoming the executive vice president and administrative vice-president of Wesleyan University in order to fulfill his lifelong interest in serving the public good. In 1970, after Edwin Etherington left Wesleyan to make an unsuccessful run for the United States Senate as a Republican candidate from Connecticut, Campbell was elected as the university's thirteenth, and youngest, president. He served as president of the university until 1988 when he was succeeded by William Chace, the former vice provost of Stanford University.

Campbell left Wesleyan on July 31, 1988, to join the Rockefeller Brothers Fund, a nonprofit charitable organization. He latterly served as the Chairman Emeritus of the Colonial Williamsburg Foundation.

== Personal life ==
Campbell was married to Nancy Nash, who later served as chair of the National Trust for Historic Preservation. Together, they had four children. Campbell died on June 21, 2024, at the age of 88.
