= J. Griswold Webb =

American politician

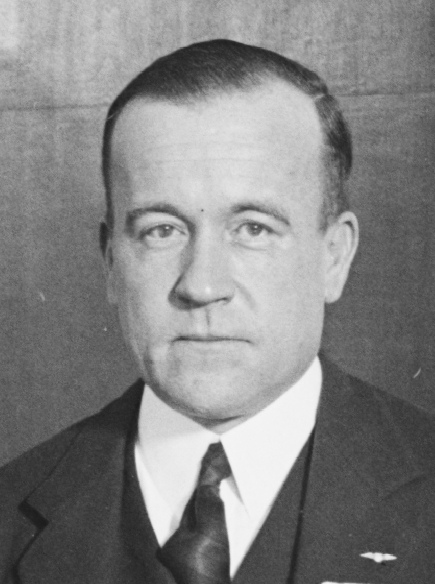

Member of the New York State Senate (28th District)
- In office January 1, 1923 – May 5, 1934
- Preceded by: James E. Towner
- Succeeded by: Frederic H. Bontecou

Member of the New York State Assembly (for Dutchess County)
- In office January 1, 1919 – December 31, 1922
- Preceded by: James C. Allen
- Succeeded by: Howard N. Allen

Personal details
- Born: John Griswold Webb; August 13, 1890 Riverdale, Bronx, New York City, U.S.
- Died: May 5, 1934 (aged 43) Hyde Park, New York, U.S.
- Party: Republican
- Spouse: Anne Pendleton Rogers (m. 1914)
- Relations: James W. Webb (grandfather); John A. Griswold (grandfather); William Seward Webb (uncle); Eliza Vanderbilt Webb (aunt)
- Children: 2
- Parent(s): H. Walter Webb; Leila Griswold Webb Codman
- Education: Groton School
- Alma mater: Harvard University; Cornell University College of Agriculture

John Griswold Webb (August 13, 1890 – May 5, 1934) was an American politician from New York.

== Early life ==
Webb was born on August 13, 1890, at Riverdale in the Bronx. He was the son of railroad executive H. Walter Webb (1856–1900) and Amelia (née Griswold) Webb (1856-1910). In 1904, Leila Webb, now a widow, married Ogden Codman, Jr., the noted society architect and interior decorator best known for his novel written with Edith Wharton.

His paternal grandfather was U.S. Minister to Brazil James Watson Webb and his maternal grandfather was U.S. Congressman John Augustus Griswold. Among his uncles was Civil War general Alexander S. Webb and railroad executive Dr. William Seward Webb, who married Eliza Vanderbilt, the daughter of William K. Vanderbilt.

Webb was a graduate of the Groton School, in Groton, Massachusetts, and Harvard College, in Cambridge, Massachusetts, in 1913. In 1912, he went with a fellow Harvard student by car from New York City to Vancouver, a then unprecedented adventure.

== Career ==
In 1912, Webb was a war correspondent for the Boston Herald in Mexico. From 1914 to 1915, he studied at the Cornell University College of Agriculture. Beginning in 1915, he was the owner and General Manager of "Webb Farms" in Clinton Corners, New York.

=== Public office ===
Webb was a Republican member of the New York State Assembly (Dutchess Co., 1st D.) in 1919, 1920, 1921 and 1922; and was Chairman of the Committee on Charitable and Religious Societies in 1922.

He was a member of the New York State Senate (28th D.) from 1923 until his death in 1934, sitting in the 146th, 147th, 148th, 149th, 150th, 151st, 152nd, 153rd, 154th, 155th, 156th and 157th New York State Legislature; and was Chairman of the Special Joint Legislative Committee on Aviation from 1928 until his death in 1934.

== Personal life ==
On May 16, 1914, he married Anne Pendleton Rogers (1894–1983), the daughter of Archibald Rogers. Together, they were the parents of two children:

- John Griswold Webb Jr. (b. 1916), who attended the Groton School.
- Amelia Griswold "Leila" Webb (b. 1920).

Webb was a member of the Harvard Club of New York City, the Racquet and Tennis Club, and the Knickerbocker Club in New York City as well as the Automobile Club of America.

He died on May 5, 1934, at Crumwold Hall, his estate designed by Richard Morris Hunt in Hyde Park, New York, after a long illness.

== Notes ==
New York State Assembly
Preceded by James C. Allen	New York State Assembly; Dutchess County, 1st District; 1919–1922	Succeeded by Howard N. Allen
New York State Senate
Preceded by James E. Towner	New York State Senate; 28th District; 1923–1934	Succeeded by Frederic H. Bontecou
