= Albert Bostwick =

Albert Bostwick may refer to:

- Albert C. Bostwick Jr. (1901–1980), American steeplechase jockey and racehorse owner, breeder and trainer
- Albert Carlton Bostwick (1878–1911), American banker, sportsman, and automobile enthusiast
