= Mollie Wilmot =

American socialite and philanthropist (1923–2002)

- Born: Mollie Netcher; May 9, 1923; Chicago, Illinois, U.S.
- Died: September 17, 2002 (aged 79); New York City, U.S.
- Occupations: Socialite and philanthropist
- Spouses: Eddie Bragno (m. 1947–1960) Albert C. Bostwick III (m. 1960–1967) Paul Wilmot (m. 1970–1975)
- Relatives: Francice Netcher Bushkin (sister)

Mollie Wilmot (née Netcher; May 9, 1923 – September 17, 2002) was an American philanthropist and socialite.

== Biography ==
The younger child (of two daughters) born to Charles Netcher Jr. and Gladys (née Oliver) Netcher, Wilmot spent her formative years in Europe where she studied art and achieved fluency in French. She graduated from Foxcroft School, a bucolic preparatory school in northern Virginia. Her grandmother, Mollie Netcher Newbury, launched her career at the Boston Store as a clerk and underwear buyer and was dubbed the 'Merchant Princess' in her position as owner of the Chicago department store.

Wilmot divided her time between an apartment at The Pierre in Manhattan, an oceanfront mansion next to the Kennedy estate stretching along prestigious North Ocean Blvd. on Palm Beach, Florida and a sprawling colonial property in Saratoga Springs, New York, boasting to The Times Union in 1998 that she had been born at the Ritz Hotel in Paris "feet first, six weeks early and with all my eyelashes."

Mollie was married three times, all of which ended in divorce. In 1947, she was married to Edward Albert Bragno (1910–1986). They divorced in 1960, and the following week, she was married to Albert Carlton Bostwick III (b. 1939), a son of Albert C. Bostwick Jr. and nephew of Pete Bostwick. The wedding, which took place at her home in Chicago, was performed by Judge Julius Hoffman and the best man was New York attorney Roy Cohn. They divorced in 1967, and in 1970, she married Paul Wilmot Jr.

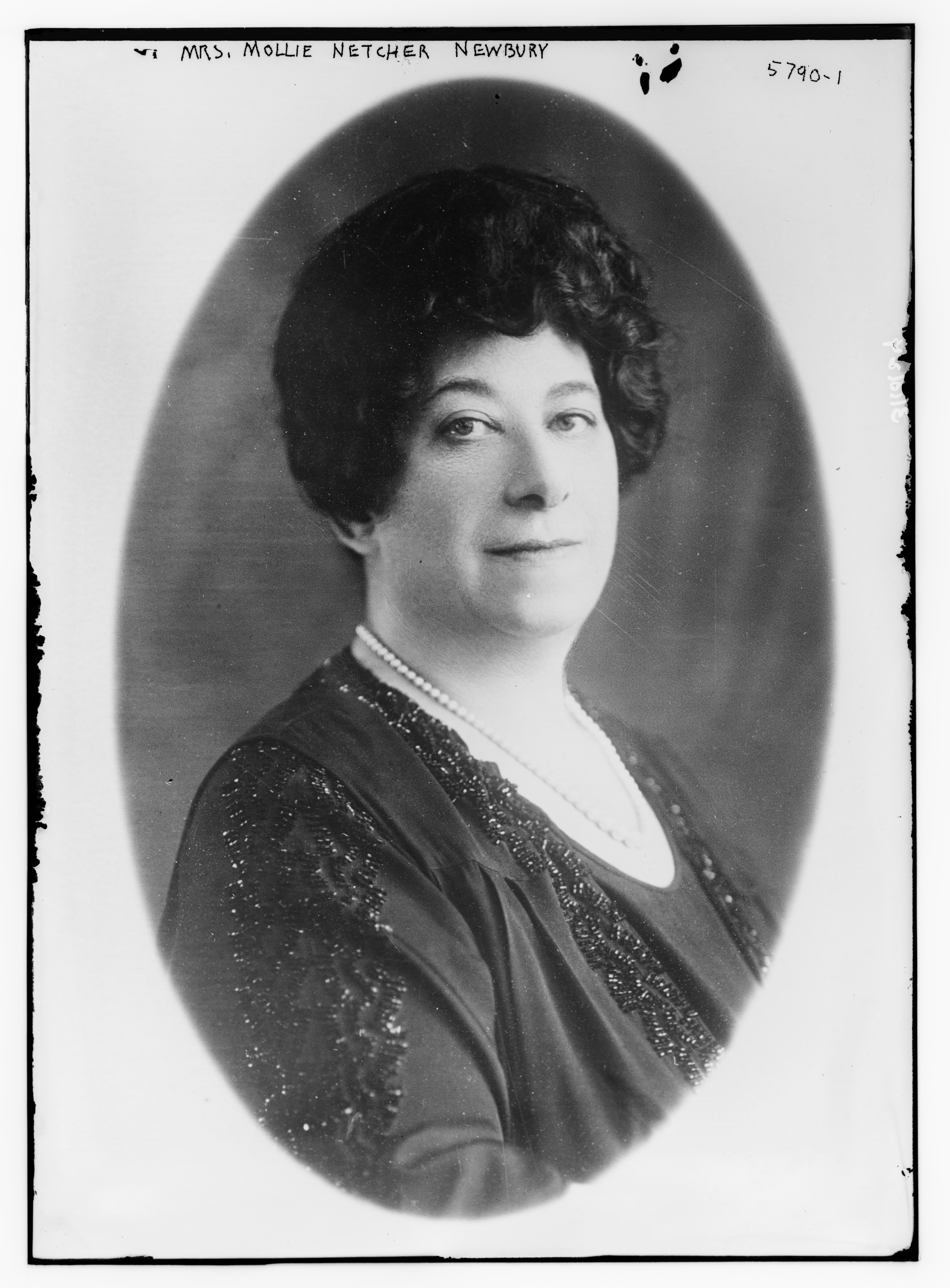
Mollie Netcher Newbury, grandmother of Mollie Wilmot

=== The Mercedes I ===
Wilmot soared to prominence in 1984 the day after Thanksgiving when a 197-foot freighter, MV Mercedes I, carrying ten Venezuelan sailors crashed into the seawall of her oceanfront Palm Beach mansion. Wilmot's staff served the sailors sandwiches and freshly brewed coffee in her gazebo and showered martinis upon journalists and photographers. The incident received national and international coverage.

=== Philanthropy ===
In her role as society hostess, Wilmot hosted an annual Sotheby's cocktail party to benefit equine research at Cornell University.

Wilmot bequeathed a generous portion of her estate to the Palm Healthcare Pavilion, which endowed the Mollie Wilmot Children's Center located in West Palm Beach, Florida and the Mollie Wilmot Radiation Oncology Center based in Saratoga Springs, New York. She also contributed to the New York City Ballet, The National Museum of Racing and Hall of Fame and the National Museum of Dance and equine research at the Veterinary College of Cornell University.
