= James Watson Webb II =

American polo champion and insurance executive

James Watson Webb
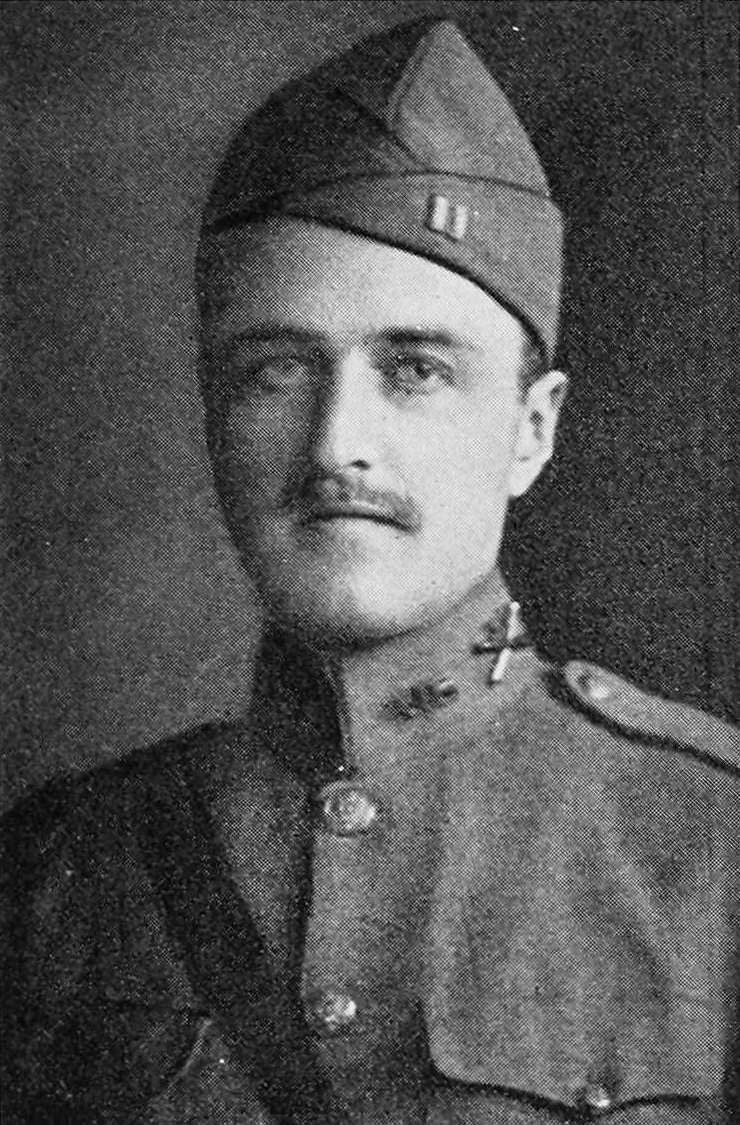
- Webb during World War I service

Member of the Vermont House of Representatives
- In office 1921–1923

Personal details
- Born: July 1, 1884 Burlington, Vermont, U.S.
- Died: March 4, 1960 (aged 75) New York City, U.S.
- Spouse: Electra Havemeyer (m. 1910)
- Children: 5
- Parent(s): William Seward Webb; Eliza Osgood Vanderbilt Webb
- Relatives: See Vanderbilt family
- Education: Groton School; Yale University
- Occupation: Chairman of Webb & Lynch

James Watson Webb II (known as James Sr.) (July 1, 1884 – March 4, 1960) was an American polo champion and insurance executive. He was a grandson of William Henry Vanderbilt and James Watson Webb.

== Early life ==
Webb was born on July 1, 1884, in Burlington, Vermont to Eliza Osgood Vanderbilt (1860–1936) of the Vanderbilt family and William Seward Webb. His siblings included Frederica Vanderbilt Webb, William Seward Webb Jr., and Vanderbilt Webb.

His paternal grandparents were James Watson Webb, the United States Ambassador to Brazil during Abraham Lincoln's administration, and Laura Virginia Cram. His paternal uncles included H. Walter Webb, a noteworthy railway executives, and Alexander Stewart Webb, a noted Civil War general. His maternal grandparents were William Henry Vanderbilt and Maria (née Kissam) Vanderbilt. His maternal aunts and uncles included Cornelius Vanderbilt II (1843–1899), Margaret Louisa Vanderbilt Shepard (1843–1924), William Kissam Vanderbilt (1849–1920), Frederick William Vanderbilt (1856–1938), Florence Adele Vanderbilt Twombly (1854–1952), Emily Thorn Vanderbilt (1852–1946) and George Washington Vanderbilt II (1862–1914).

Webb attended and graduated from the Groton School and received an A.B. from Yale University in 1907.

== Career ==
After graduating from Yale, Webb started his career with the Chicago and Northwest Railway before joining Marsh & McLennan, the New York insurance brokerage house in 1911. In 1929, he became a partner in Vanderpoel, Pausner & Webb.

In 1933, Webb founded Webb & Lynch, a general insurance brokerage firm, located at 99 John Street in New York, of which he later served as chairman.

=== Polo career ===
In 1921, and, again in 1924 and 1927, he played on the American polo team that won the International Polo Cup from England at the Meadowbrook Polo Club. His teammates in 1921 were Louis Ezekiel Stoddard, Thomas Hitchcock, Jr., and Devereaux Milburn. His teammates in 1924 were Hitchcock, Malcolm Stevenson, Robert Early Strawbridge, Jr. and Milburn, and in 1927, they were Hitchcock, Stevenson and Milburn. The Cup was the most anticipated event on the sporting calendar in the United States in the 1920s and 1930s.

Webb, a left hander, was named America's all-time all-star polo team in 1934 by Louis E. Stoddard, chairman of the United States Polo Association.

=== Public service ===
During World War I, Webb served in France as a captain of the 311th Field Artillery, 79th Infantry Division, which saw action during the Meuse-Argonne Offensive. His wife drove an ambulance in New York City, and was named Assistant Director of the Motor Corps during the War, and in 1942, during World War II she joined the Civilian Defense Volunteer Organization, and directed the Pershing Square Civil Defense Center and its blood bank.

A Republican, Webb served a term in the Vermont House of Representatives in 1921.

== Personal life ==
In 1910, he was married to Electra Havemeyer (1888–1960), daughter of Henry Osborne Havemeyer and Louisine Waldron Elder. Together, they were the parents of five children:

- Electra Webb (1910–1982), who married Dunbar Bostwick, son of Albert Carlton Bostwick, in 1932.
- Samuel Blatchley Webb (1912–1988), who married Elizabeth Richey Fisk Johnson (1914–1993) in 1935. They divorced and he later married Martha Trinkle (1910–1990).
- Lila Vanderbilt Webb (1913–1961), who married John Currie Wilmerding (1911–1965), son of Henry A. Wilmerding, in 1935.
- J. Watson Webb Jr. (1916–2000), who never married.
- Harry Havemeyer Webb (1922–1975), who married Kate deForest Jennings, a daughter of Brewster Jennings.

James died at his home, 740 Park Avenue in New York City on March 4, 1960. His widow died a little over eight months later on November 19, 1960.

=== Legacy ===
Along with his wife, he was a co-founder of the Shelburne Museum. The museum was a showcase of his wife's "collection of collections" of early American homes and public buildings, including a general store, meeting house, log cabin, and a steamship.

He was also a trustee of the New York Zoological Society and Norwich University in Northfield, Vermont, where he received an honorary Doctor of Laws in 1955.
