= Joseph Campbell (accountant) =

Fourth Comptroller General of the United States

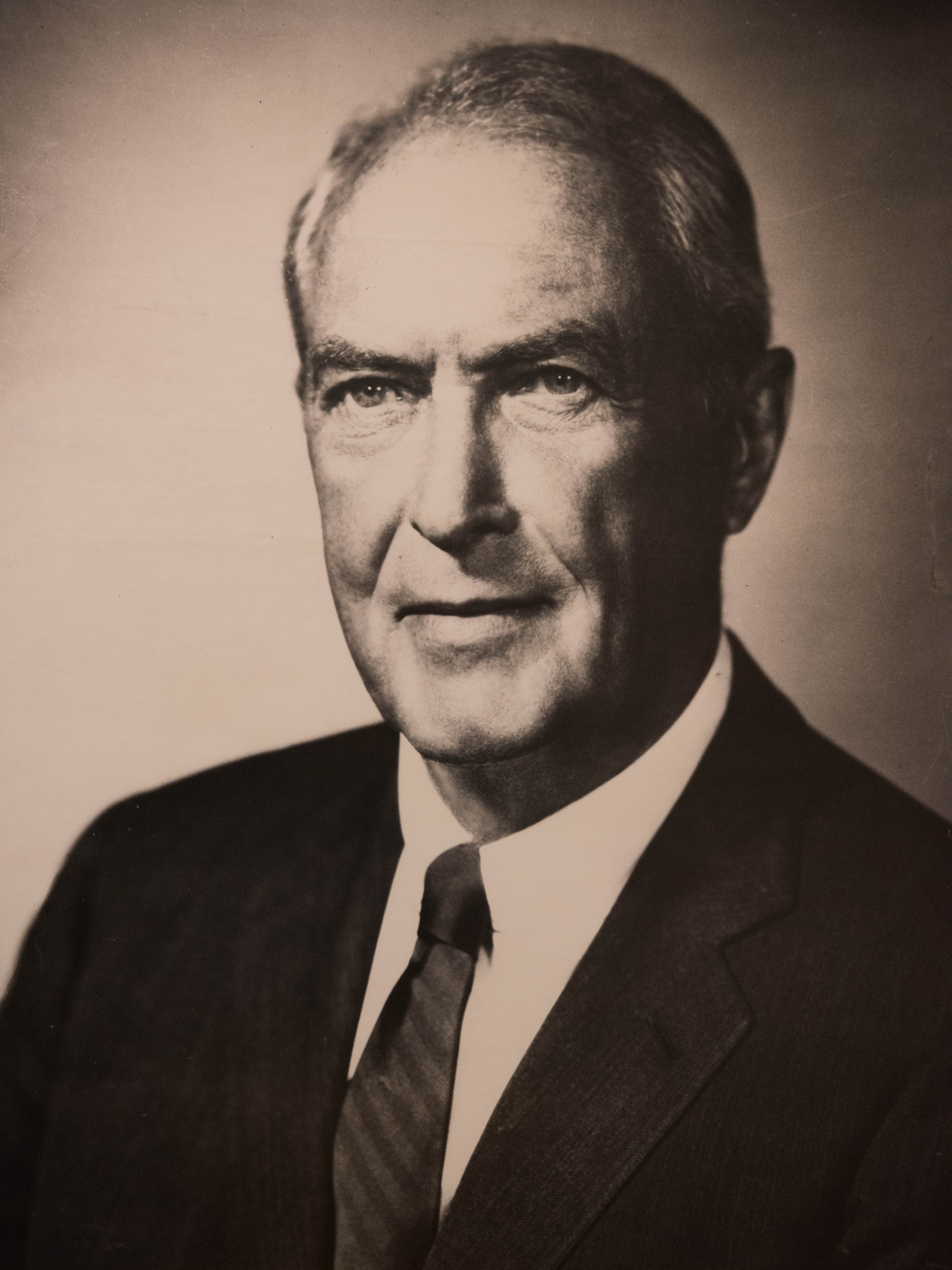

4th Comptroller General of the United States
- In office December 14, 1954 – July 31, 1965
- President: Dwight D. Eisenhower; John F. Kennedy; Lyndon B. Johnson
- Preceded by: Lindsay Carter Warren
- Succeeded by: Elmer B. Staats

Personal details
- Born: March 25, 1900 New York City, New York
- Died: June 21, 1984 (aged 84) Sarasota, Florida
- Citizenship: American
- Spouses: Marjorie Louise Goetze (m. 1925, divorced) Dorothy Stokes Bostwick (m. 1950)
- Children: 5, including Colin
- Education: Columbia University

Joseph Campbell (March 25, 1900 – June 21, 1984) was the fourth comptroller general of the United States, in office from December 14, 1954 - July 31, 1965.

== Early life ==
Campbell was born in New York City on March 25, 1900. Campbell received an Artium Baccalaureus from Columbia University in 1924.

== Career ==
He worked as an accountant at Lingley, Baird, and Dixon from 1925 until 1927. He was an assistant comptroller and a comptroller at the Valspar Corporation between 1927 and 1932. He was a partner at R. T. Lingley & Co. in 1932 and 1933. He became a CPA in New York State and Connecticut in 1933. He was a partner at Joseph Campbell & Co. from 1933 until 1941.

He served as an assistant treasurer at Columbia University beginning in 1941 and on March 13, 1949, was elected Treasurer by the Board of Trustees. He was the tenth Treasurer in the history of the university.

During the early 1950s Campbell served as a member of the United States Atomic Energy Commission and in several other capacities within the federal government. When Comptroller General Lindsay Carter Warren retired Congress was deadlocked over selecting a replacement, so President Dwight D. Eisenhower appointed Campbell with whom he was familiar with due to Eisenhower's term of presidency at Columbia University. Campbell departed the office before his 15-year term of office concluded due to health issues.

== Personal life ==
His first marriage was to Marjorie Louise Goetze (d. 1973) on September 1, 1925. She later served as president of the board of governors for the Mansfield Training School. Together the couple had five boys:

- Frederick Campbell (1927–2007), who married Patricia Miller and Charlotte O'Loughlin.
- Douglas Goetze Campbell (1928–2018), who married Sandra Woodworth, daughter of Wade Woodworth.
- Robert Goetze Campbell, a physician who married Barbara Helen Yoder.
- Alan Goetze Campbell, who married Jennie Reed Fowlkes, daughter of Francis Meriwether Fowlkes.
- Colin Goetze Campbell (1935–2024), who served as president of Wesleyan University, the Rockefeller Brothers Fund, and president and chair of the Colonial Williamsburg Foundation. Colin married Nancy Nash, who later served as chair of the National Trust for Historic Preservation.

In 1950, he married artist and philanthropist Dorothy Stokes Bostwick. Dorothy, the daughter of Albert Carlton Bostwick and granddaughter of Standard Oil founding shareholder, Jabez A. Bostwick, was previously married to W. T. Sampson Smith, grandson of Rear Admiral William T. Sampson.

Campbell died at his home in Sarasota, Florida, on June 21, 1984.
