= Samuel Blachley Webb =

Officer in the American Revolutionary War

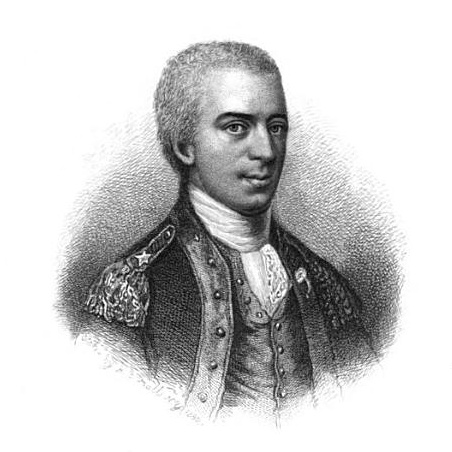
- Born: December 15, 1753; Weathersfield, Connecticut
- Died: November 3, 1807 (aged 53); Claverack, New York
- Occupations: Soldier, merchant
- Children: James Watson Webb Henry Livingston Webb

Samuel Blachley Webb (1753–1807) was the commanding officer of the 9th Connecticut Regiment in the American Revolutionary War.

== Early life and family ==
Samuel Blachley Webb was born on December 15, 1753. He was the second son of a wealthy Connecticut merchant, Joseph Webb, and his wife, Mehitabel Nott Webb. The Webb family lived in a large home on Main Street in Wethersfield, Connecticut. The home is currently open to the public as part of the Webb Deane Stevens Museum

Webb's father died in 1761 when Samuel was eight years old. His mother married the family attorney, Silas Deane, two years later. Webb's mother died in 1767, and Webb's stepfather soon remarried. Deane's second wife, Elizabeth Saltonstall, was a granddaughter of Gurdon Saltonstall, a governor of the Connecticut Colony.

== Youth and political career ==
In 1772, when Webb was nineteen, he was sent to the Caribbean to serve as the factor (business agent) for his family's international trading business. He was highly successful with this endeavor, and by 1774 he was the chief factor for a pair of trading ships.

Also in 1774, Webb started a short political career as an assistant to his stepfather, Silas Deane, an elected representative of the Connecticut legislature. Deane had emerged as a leading advocate for colonial rights and served on the Committees of Correspondence and of Safety, the two bodies to coordinate the thirteen colonies' responses to British outrages in America. Deane was also elected to represent Connecticut at the First Continental Congress, and he took Webb with him to Philadelphia as his assistant. Webb's job in Philadelphia consisted of taking notes, writing letters, and sending reports home to their supporters.

As Deane's assistant, Samuel Webb learned much about the issues that were separating the colonies from Britain, as well as the plans and problems with arming a militia for the revolution. Webb was able to meet with many of the leaders of the coming revolution including George Washington and Benjamin Franklin.

== Military career ==
News of the Battles of Lexington and Concord reached Wethersfield in the spring of 1775. John Chester, the captain of the local militia company, was Webb's friend and brother-in-law. Webb took the post of ensign for the militia company when its previous ensign, Barnabas Deane (brother of Silas) resigned his commission. Barnabas Deane and Webb's brother Joseph remained at home to manage the growing family businesses, while Silas Deane returned to Philadelphia to serve in the Second Continental Congress, and Webb marched to Boston as ensign of the Wethersfield Militia Company.

The Wethersfield Militia Company stood out in comparison to the other militia companies that arrived in Boston within a week of each other. They were the only militia company wearing uniforms, which were bright blue coats with red facings. Due to their impressive military attire and enthusiasm of their younger leadership, members of the Wethersfield Militia Company were given some very visible assignments during the year-long Siege of Boston. They were chosen to serve as the official guards for General Artemas Ward, the area commander who was in place until Washington arrived.

The Wethersfield Militia Company was also heavily involved with the Battle of Bunker Hill. The company served as rear guards in the battle and was one of few that remained until the very end of the fighting. Both Captain Chester and Samuel Webb rose in rank quickly after reports of their courageousness spread to senior officers.

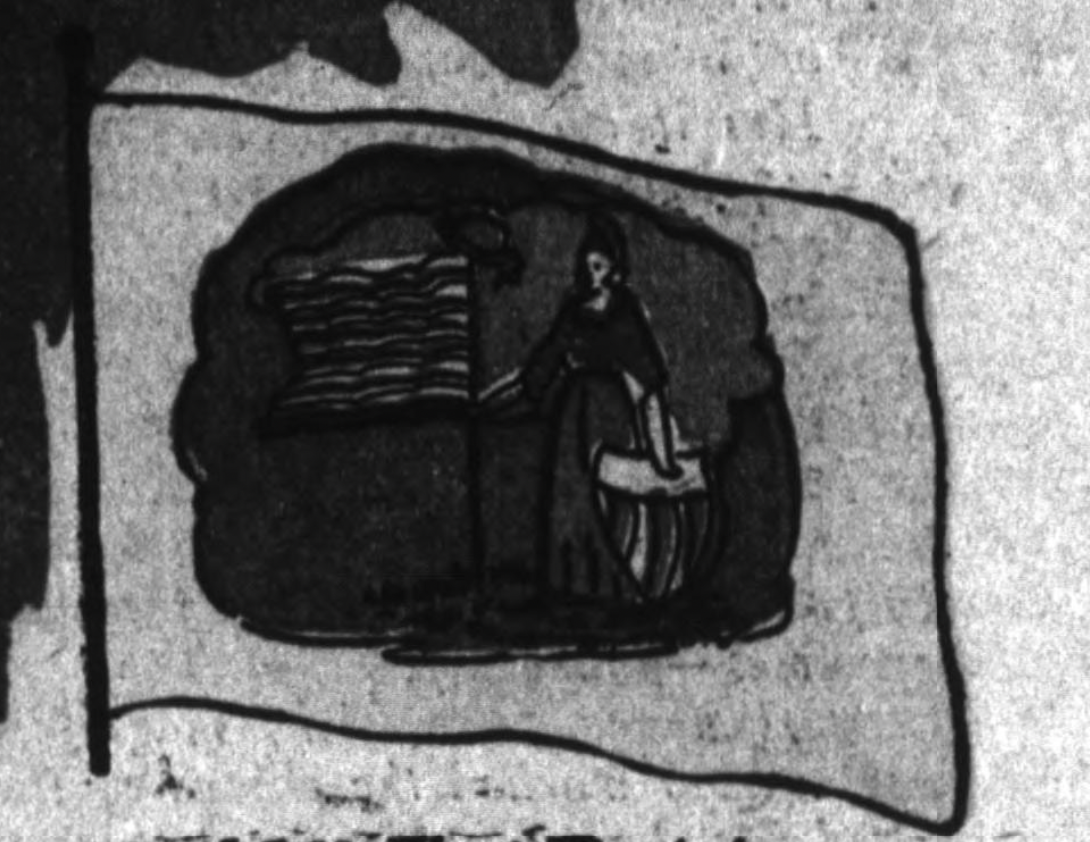
Webb's personal flag, 1775

Within a month after Bunker Hill, Webb was promoted to captain, brevet major, and aide-de-camp to Major General Israel Putnam. He spent the next year helping Putnam with writing letters and reports. This contribution was noticed by General Washington due to the contrast with Putnam's previous record of poor composition and frequent failure to do paperwork properly.

The Siege of Boston lasted for another year, until Americans positioned heavy cannons on Roxbury Heights in March 1776. The British commander ordered an evacuation of the garrison, allowing Washington a brief occupation of Boston. However, Washington marched his army south to New York soon after. He put his men to work in New York, building fortifications along the shorelines and bays of Manhattan, Long Island, Staten Island, and up the Hudson River.

Congress had provided Washington with an army, but Washington had to recruit his own general staff to handle plans, orders, reports, and other logistical tasks. Washington's aides-de-camp, officers who functioned as his administrative assistants, became that general staff. One of the first men he approached to be an aide-de-camp was Webb, then a major. In June 1776, Webb was promoted to the rank of lieutenant colonel and aide-de-camp to Washington. He worked directly alongside Washington during the summer and fall campaigns of 1776, during which the Continental Army was forced out of New York and across New Jersey.

Webb served as an active and aggressive battlefield assistant during the first two years of the war, becoming the only aide to be wounded three times in battle while on Washington's staff. On December 25–26, 1776, during George Washington's crossing of the Delaware River, Webb was in Washington's boat. He was shot off his horse later on December 26, while carrying orders across the battlefield at the Battle of Trenton.

While he was recovering at home, Webb was promoted to the rank of regimental colonel by Washington in January 1777. He was given orders to recruit an additional Connecticut Regiment of the Continental Army. In December 1777, Colonel Webb was captured by a British warship. It was a custom of the day to offer parole to officers taken prisoner, and as a result, Webb was allowed to board in a private home on Long Island during his captivity. He was also allowed to travel often between enemy lines on personal business. He made frequent trips home to Wethersfield, to his regiment in Rhode Island, to General Washington's headquarters, and to visit Elizabeth Bancker, a young lady he was courting in North Raritan, New Jersey.

In October 1780, while still a prisoner of war, Webb married Elizabeth in a small ceremony, in an effort to avoid attracting attention. The couple had a brief honeymoon. Four months later Webb was released in a prisoner exchange, and immediately returned to his regiment.

In May 1781, Webb traveled back to Wethersfield to meet at his childhood home with Washington and French General Rochambeau. They were meeting to plan the Siege of Yorktown, the final major conflict of the American Revolution. Following this, Webb returned to his regiment where he remained until it was disbanded in September 1783.

== Later life ==
Webb became a merchant in New York City, and in early September 1790, he married his second wife, Catherine Hogeboom, and moved to her family's farm in Claverack, New York.

In recognition of his wartime services, Webb was promoted by Washington to brigadier general upon his retirement. He remained a friend to Washington and served as grand marshal at Washington's inauguration in 1789. He was an original member of the Society of the Cincinnati.

His children included journalist and diplomat James Watson Webb, and Henry Livingston Webb, a soldier and politician.
