= H. Walter Webb =

Henry Walter Webb
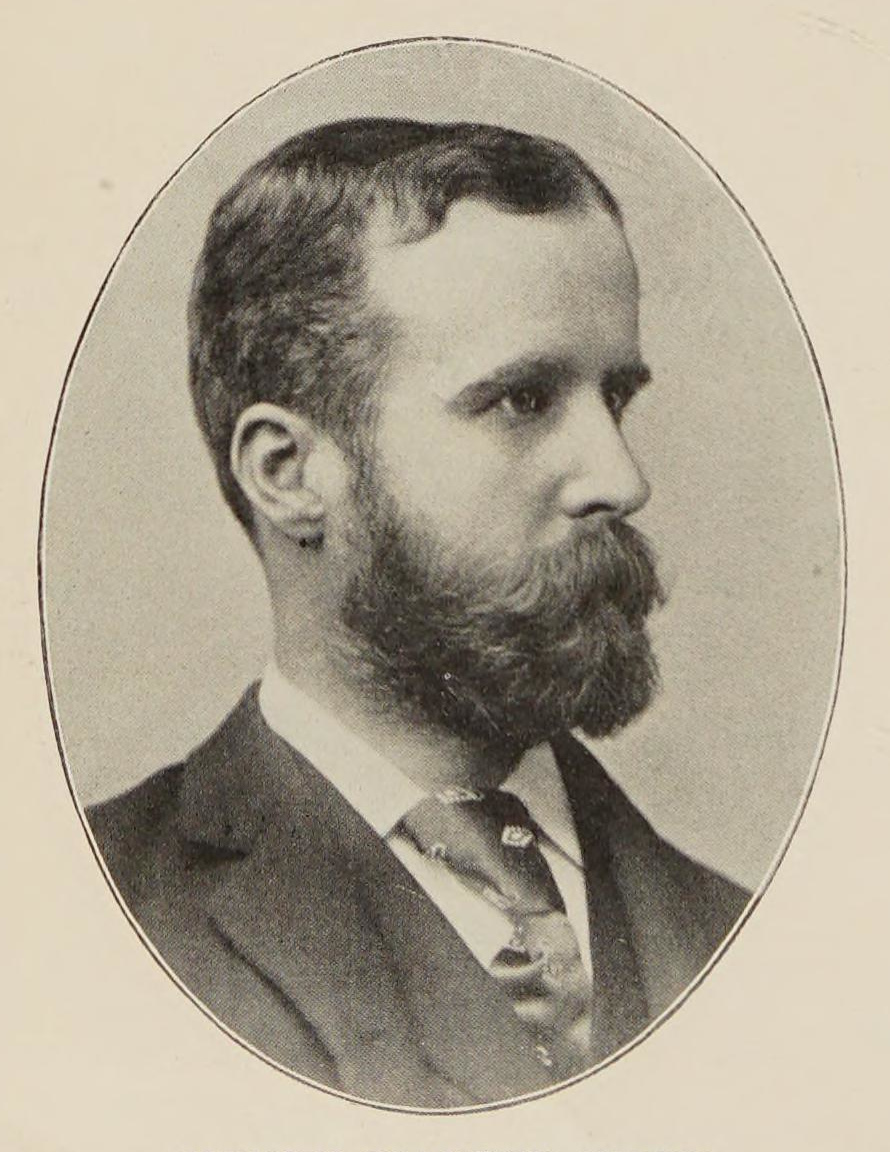
- Born: June 6, 1852; Tarrytown, New York
- Died: June 18, 1900 (aged 48); Scarborough, New York
- Education: Columbia College School of Mines; Columbia Law School
- Spouse: Leila Howard Griswold (m. 1884)
- Children: Henry Walter Webb, Jr. J. Griswold Webb
- Parent: James Watson Webb
- Relatives: William Seward Webb (brother); Alexander S. Webb (brother); James Watson Webb II (nephew); Alexander S. Webb Jr. (nephew)

Henry Walter Webb Sr. (May 6, 1852 – June 18, 1900) was an American railway executive with the New York Central Railroad under Cornelius Vanderbilt and Chauncey Depew. He was also Vice President of the Wagner Palace Car Co.

== Early life ==
Webb was born on May 6, 1852, in Tarrytown, New York. He was the son of James Watson Webb (1802–1884), a United States Minister to Brazil, and his father's second wife, Laura Virginia Cram (1826–1890). Among his siblings was brother Dr. William Seward Webb, who was married to Eliza Osgood Vanderbilt; and Alexander Steward Webb, the longstanding President of City College of New York.

Webb was head of his class in the Columbia College School of Mines (now incorporated into the School of Engineering and Applied Science). He was a member of the fraternity St. Anthony Hall. While still an undergraduate, he participated in the Orton expedition that ascended the Amazon River almost to its source, and crossing the Andes, he exited South America by way of Peru, returning to the US by ship. He then studied law, also at Columbia, and passed the bar in 1875.

== Career ==
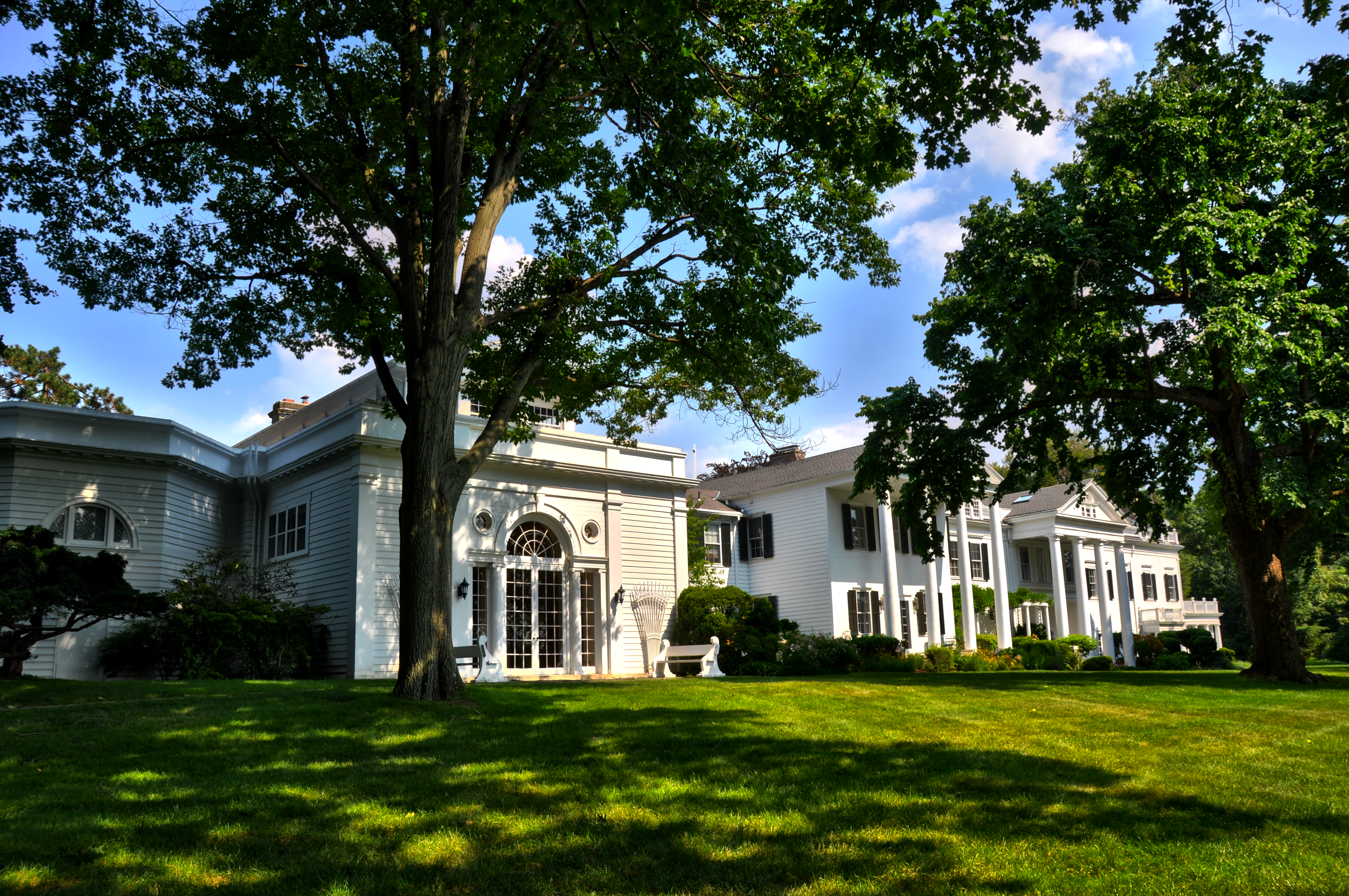
Webb's country residence, Beechwood.

After briefly practiced law, which he found unsatisfying, he soon thereafter became active in Wall Street banking and brokerage. He drifted into the railway business almost by accident through his brother, Dr. William Seward Webb, who married Eliza Vanderbilt, a daughter of William H. Vanderbilt, and became interested in the Wagner Palace Car Company which the Vanderbilts controlled. When Webster Wagner, the company's president was suddenly crushed between two of his own cars in 1882, Dr. Webb became president of the company and invited his brother to join it.

Webb was an advocate of fast railway travel and ran what was then the fastest railway train in the world, averaging nearly 60 miles per hour over 450 miles. In 1893 he made a bold and ultimately true prediction for the next hundred years: By 1993, a traveler will be able to have his breakfast in New York City and his evening meal in Chicago.

Webb lived in Scarborough, New York, was Show Chairman of the Westminster Kennel Club (1880–1882), subscriber to the Blackstone Memorial (1891), and helped dedicate a bronze statue of Christopher Columbus in Central Park (1894).

H. Walter Webb retired due to tuberculosis around 1897.

== Personal life ==
In 1884, Webb married Leila Howard Griswold (1856–1910), and they had three children, two of whom survived to adulthood:

- Henry Walter Webb Jr. (c.1885–1919)
- John Griswold Webb (1890–1934), a New York State Senator who married Anne Pendleton Rogers (1894–1983).

He died from heart trouble on June 18, 1900, at his country residence, Beechwood, in Scarborough, New York. After his death, his widow married architect and interior decorator Ogden Codman Jr., best known for novel co-authored with Edith Wharton, The Decoration of Houses (1897), which became a standard in American interior design.
