= MV Mercedes I =

Merchant ship built in 1952 in Hamburg, Germany

Coordinates: 26.1559°N 80.0823°W

History

Venezuela
- Name: Jacob Rusch; Rosita Maria; Rita Voge; Mercedes I (1976)
- Builder: Hamburg, Germany
- Launched: 1952
- Identification: IMO number: 5428829
- Fate: Wrecked on 23 November 1984; Salvaged, and scuttled on 30 March 1985

General characteristics
- Tonnage: 496 GRT
- Length: 194 ft (59.13 m)
- Beam: 30.6 ft (9.33 m)

Mercedes I was a merchant ship built in 1952 in Hamburg, Germany. She was 194 feet (59 m) long and measured 496 Gross register tons. She was originally named Jacob Rusch, later being renamed Rosita Maria, Rita Voge, and finally Mercedes I in 1976.

She was caught in a storm while at anchor off Palm Beach, Florida on 23 November 1984, and was driven ashore where she crashed into the seawall front of the home of Palm Beach socialite, Mollie Wilmot, who served the 12 Venezuelan sailors caviar, finger sandwiches and freshly brewed coffee in her gazebo, offered martinis to journalists and photographers, and granted the stranded Venezuelans access to her swimming pool. The incident received national and international coverage.

After being abandoned by her owners, she was salvaged by the Donjon Marine Company, who sold her for $29,000 to the Broward County Environmental Quality Control Board. They scuttled her on 30 March 1985 with 350 pounds of TNT off the coast of Ft. Lauderdale, in order to create an artificial reef used as a recreational dive site. She currently rests upright in 97 feet (30 m).
