= Ralph Pulitzer =

American newspaper publisher

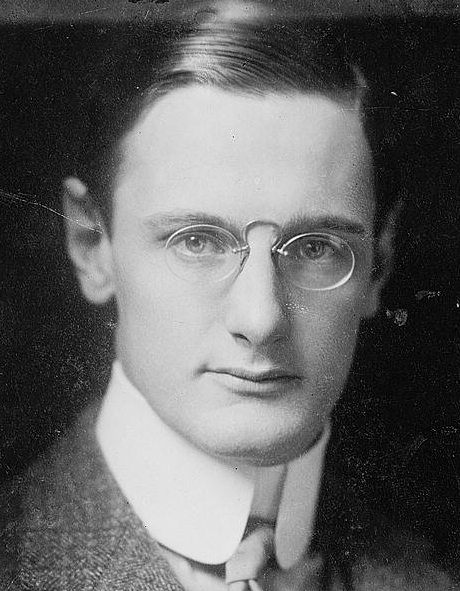
- Born: June 11, 1879; St. Louis, Missouri, U.S.
- Died: June 14, 1939 (aged 60); New York City, U.S.
- Resting place: Woodlawn Cemetery
- Education: Harvard University
- Occupation: Publisher
- Spouses: Frederica Vanderbilt Webb (m. 1905; div. 1924) Margaret Leech (m. 1928)
- Children: 3
- Parent(s): Joseph Pulitzer; Katherine Davis Pulitzer

Ralph Pulitzer (June 11, 1879 – June 14, 1939) was an American heir, newspaper publisher and author. He served as the president of the Press Publishing Co., which published the New York World and the Evening World.

== Early life ==
Ralph Pulitzer was born on June 11, 1879, in St. Louis, Missouri. He was the son of Katherine "Kate" (née Davis) Pulitzer and Joseph Pulitzer, the newspaper magnate. His mother was rumored to be a distant relative of Jefferson Davis, former president of the Confederate States of America.

Pulitzer was educated at St. Mark's School in Southborough, Massachusetts. He graduated from Harvard University.

== Career ==
Pulitzer served as the publisher of the New York World until 1931, when it was acquired by E. W. Scripps Company. He subsequently served as the vice president of the Pulitzer Publishing Company, which published the St. Louis Post-Dispatch.

Pulitzer was the author of two books. His first book, entitled New York Society on Parade, was published in 1910. His second book, entitled Over the Front in an Aeroplane and scenes inside the French and Flemish Trenches, was published in 1915; it was about World War I. His book contains descriptions of life in the trenches and the artillery used by the French in the early months of the War. It also includes sixteen photographs taken during his tour of several locations on the Front.

Pulitzer was an active supporter of the National Air Races. He sponsored the Pulitzer Trophy Race to encourage higher speed in landplanes. He was also a big-game hunter.

== Personal life and death ==
Pulitzer was married twice. On October 14, 1905, he married Frederica Vanderbilt Webb (1882–1949), the daughter of Eliza Osgood Vanderbilt Webb and William Seward Webb. Before their divorce in Paris, France in 1924, they were the parents of two sons:

- Ralph Pulitzer Jr. (1906–1965), who married Bess Aspinwall.
- Seward Webb Pulitzer (1911–1972), who married Billie Boldemann in March 1932.

Four months after their divorce, Frederica married Cyril Hamlen Jones, later headmaster of Milton Academy in Milton, Massachusetts, and the former tutor to Pulitzer's two sons during the winter of 1921 to 1922. In 1928, Ralph Pulitzer married Vassar College graduate Margaret Kernochan Leech, who, after his death, received two Pulitzer Prizes for her own work. One of his daughters by his second marriage died of infantile paralysis, or poliomyelitis, in France before her first birthday. The other was:

- Susan Pulitzer (1932–1965), who married Sydney J. Freedberg in April 1954.

Pulitzer died during an abdominal operation on June 14, 1939, at the Presbyterian Hospital in New York City. His funeral was held at St. Thomas Protestant Episcopal Church. He was buried in Woodlawn Cemetery, in the Bronx. His widow died at her home, 812 Fifth Avenue, on February 24, 1974.

== Works ==
- Pulitzer, Ralph (1910). New York Society on Parade. New York: Harper & Bros. OCLC 2880641.
- Pulitzer, Ralph (1915). Over the Front in an Aeroplane, and Scenes inside the French and Flemish Trenches. New York: Harper & Bros. OCLC 1635679.
