= Neji (horse) =

British-bred Thoroughbred racehorse

- Sire: Hunters Moon IV
- Grandsire: Foxhunter
- Dam: Accra
- Damsire: Annapolis
- Sex: Gelding
- Foaled: 1950
- Country: Great Britain
- Colour: Chestnut
- Breeder: Marian duPont Scott
- Owner: Rigan McKinney; Lillian Bostwick Phipps (from age 3)
- Trainer: Pete Bostwick; Mike Smithwick (at age 6); Daniel L. Moore (age 9 in England)
- Record: 49: 17-11-9
- Earnings: $270,834

Major wins
- Brook National Handicap (1954 & 1955); Temple Gwathmey Handicap (1955 & 1957); American Grand National (1955,1957 & 1958)

Awards
- American Steeplechase Champion (1955, 1957, 1958)

Honours
- United States Racing Hall of Fame inductee (1966); Aiken Thoroughbred Racing Hall of Fame (1977)

Neji (1950–1982) was an American Champion Thoroughbred steeplechase racehorse. Foaled in England, Neji was purchased at age three by Lillian Bostwick Phipps who brought the gelding to race in the United States under future Hall of Fame trainer Pete Bostwick.

In the mid to late 1950s, Neji dominated American steeplechase racing, winning its most prestigious races, including three Grand Nationals. He was voted American Steeplechase Champion in 1955 but in 1956 his season was marred by a leg injury. However, he came back to win Champion honors in 1957 and then for a third time in 1958. The next year his owner sent him to race in England but he met with little success in his three races there. Returning to the U.S., he raced successfully in 1960 and was retired at the end of that racing season with an earnings record that stood for the next 22 years.

In 1966, Neji was inducted in the United States' National Museum of Racing and Hall of Fame.
