= Albert Carlton Bostwick =

American banker, sportsman and automobile enthusiast

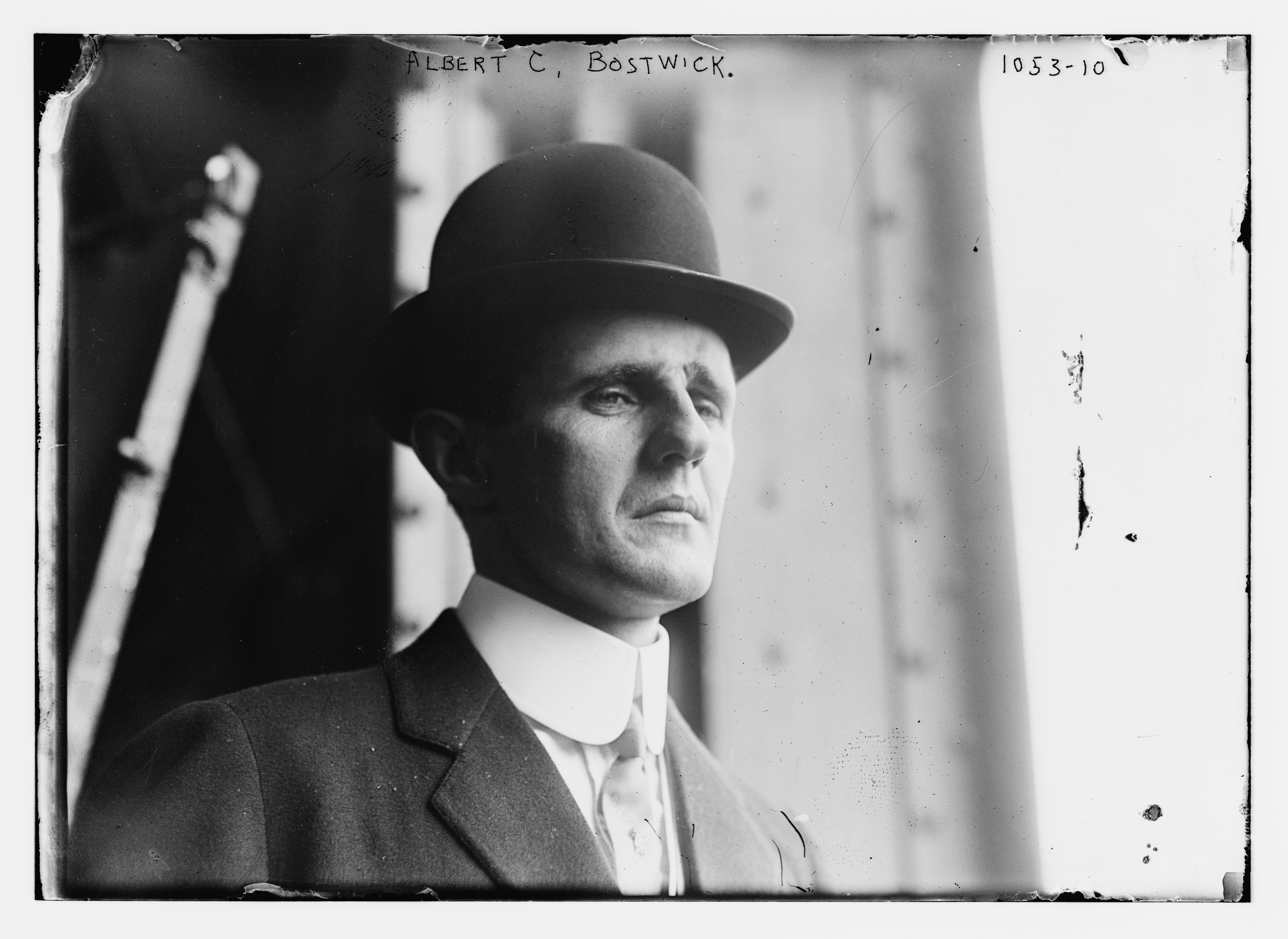
- Born: June 22, 1878; New York City, New York, U.S.
- Died: November 10, 1911 (aged 33); New York City, New York, U.S.
- Resting place: Woodlawn Cemetery
- Spouse: Marie Lillian Stokes (m. 1898–1911)
- Children: Dorothy Stokes Bostwick; Albert C. Bostwick Jr. Lillian Bostwick Phipps; Dunbar Wright Bostwick; Pete Bostwick
- Parent(s): Jabez A. Bostwick; Helen Celia Ford Bostwick
- Relatives: Joe Carstairs (niece)

Albert Carlton Bostwick (June 22, 1878 – November 10, 1911) was an American banker, sportsman, and automobile enthusiast.

== Early life ==
Bostwick was born in New York City on June 22, 1878. He was the only son born to Jabez A. Bostwick and Helen Celia (née Ford) Bostwick (1848–1920). His father was a founding partner of Standard Oil and a major shareholder and President of the New York and New England Railroad, a substantial shareholder in the Housatonic Railroad, and a member of the New York Cotton Exchange. His two sisters were Nellie Ford Bostwick, who married twice, and Frances Evelyn "Fannie" Bostwick, who married four times, including to Dr. Serge Voronoff.

His maternal grandparents were Smith Reed Ford and Frances Lee (née Fox) Ford. His paternal grandparents were Abel Bostwick and Sally (née Fitch) Bostwick.

== Career ==
Bostwick began working for Walter C. Stokes & Co., a brokerage firm, as a delivery boy. In 1899, he became a special partner of the firm. He was also a deputy sheriff of Westchester County, where he had an estate in Mamaroneck.

He was an "enthusiastic horseman and yachtsman, and fond of automobiling." Bostwick was a member of the New York Yacht Club, the American Yacht Club, a former Commodore of the Larchmont Yacht Club, the Union League Club, the Riding Club, the Westchester Country Club, the Apawamis Club, and the Meadow Brook Club. With his automobile, Bostwick set several land speed records in the United States and Europe.

Bostwick owned Limited, a 46-foot steam yacht and Vergemere, a 315-foot auxiliary schooner.

== Personal life ==
In June 1898, Bostwick was married to Marie Lillian Stokes (1877–1962) by the Rev. Dr. David H. Greer at St. Bartholomew's Episcopal Church in New York City. Marie was the daughter of Sophia Isaacs (née Lockwood) Stokes and Henry Bolter Stokes, president of the Manhattan Life Insurance Company. Her sister, Florence Lockwood Stokes, was married to F. Ambrose Clark (a son of Alfred Corning Clark and grandson of Edward Cabot Clark). Together, they lived at 801 Fifth Avenue (in a residence adjoining his mother) and were the parents of:

- Dorothy Stokes Bostwick (1899–2001), a philanthropist and the first woman to hold a helicopter pilot's license. She married W. T. Sampson Smith, grandson of Rear Admiral William T. Sampson. She later married Joseph Campbell, the 4th Comptroller General of the United States.
- Albert C. Bostwick Jr. (1901–1980), a thoroughbred racehorse owner and breeder whose horse Mate won the 1931 Preakness Stakes. He married Eleanor P. Sage in 1937.
- Lillian Bostwick (1906–1987), an owner of Thoroughbred steeplechase racehorses who won the American Grand National eight times and who married Ogden Phipps.
- Dunbar Wright Bostwick (1908–2006), the chairman of the Aviation Instrument Manufacturing Corp. who was a standardbred horse breeder. He married Electra Webb, a daughter of Electra Havemeyer Webb and James Watson Webb II, granddaughter of Lila Vanderbilt Webb.
- George Herbert "Pete" Bostwick (1909–1982), a Hall of Fame polo player, U.S. Racing Hall of Fame steeplechase jockey and horse trainer.

After a two-week illness, Bostwick died at the home of his mother, 800 Fifth Avenue in New York City, on November 10, 1911. After his death, his widow remarried to Fitch Gilbert Jr., a Harvard and Columbia Law School graduate and farmer, in 1914.
