= Albert C. Bostwick Jr. =

American racehorse owner, breeder, and trainer

- Born: April 1, 1901; Manhattan, New York, U.S.
- Died: September 26, 1980 (aged 79); Old Westbury, New York, U.S.
- Occupations: Steeplechase rider, Racehorse owner/breeder
- Spouse: Eleanor Purviance Sage (m. 1936–1980)
- Children: Albert C. Bostwick III
- Parent(s): Albert Carlton Bostwick Sr. Mary Lillian Stokes
- Relatives: Dorothy Bostwick (sister); Lillian Bostwick (sister); Dunbar Bostwick (brother); Pete Bostwick (brother)

Albert Carlton Bostwick Jr. (April 1, 1901 – September 26, 1980) was a member of the wealthy and prominent Bostwick family who became a steeplechase jockey and a Thoroughbred racehorse owner, breeder and trainer.

== Early life ==
Albert Bostwick, known to his family as "Brother", was the eldest boy of five children born to Mary Lillian (née Stokes) Bostwick and Albert Carlton Bostwick Sr. Among his siblings was Dorothy Stokes Bostwick, Lillian Bostwick Phipps, Dunbar Bostwick, and Pete Bostwick. His father, a banker and sportsman, set early automobile speed records. After his death in 1911, his mother remarried in 1914 to Fitch Gilbert Jr., a Harvard and Columbia Law School graduate and farmer.

His maternal grandfather, Henry Bolter Stokes, was president of the Manhattan Life Insurance Company, and his paternal grandfather, Jabez Bostwick, was a founder and treasurer of the Standard Oil and a partner of John D. Rockefeller.

On the death of his father in 1911, Bostwick inherited a sizeable fortune. His grandmother, Helen Celia (née Ford) Bostwick, upon her death in April 1920, left to him a sum of $1,156,818.

== Horse racing ==
Bostwick rode horses from a young age, taught by his uncle F. Ambrose Clark, and became a successful amateur steeplechase rider in the United States and in England. He also became involved in the sport of Thoroughbred flat racing and is best known as the owner/breeder of Mate, winner of the 1931 Preakness Stakes. A member of The Jockey Club, in 1932 he obtained a license to train horses.

He was a member of the Union Club, the Racquet and Tennis Club, the Turf and Field Club, the Meadow Brook Club and the River Club.

== Personal life ==
In 1936, Bostwick was married to Eleanor (née Purviance) Sage (1904–2004). Eleanor was the former wife of Henry Williams Sage (a descendant of Henry W. Sage) and was the daughter of John Nelson Purviance and Helen (née Morgan) Purviance. Before their divorce, they lived on the 15th floor of the Rosario Candela designed 778 Park Avenue (the apartment, a floor below Brooke Astor's apartment, was later owned by Roone Arledge), and had one son together:

- Albert Carlton Bostwick III (b. 1939), who in 1960 married socialite Mollie (née Netcher) Bragno (1923–2002), heiress to a Chicago department store fortune. The wedding, which took place at her home in Chicago, was performed by Judge Julius Hoffman and the best man was New York attorney Roy Cohn. They divorced, and in 1970, she married for the third time to Paul C. Wilmot Jr.

The Bostwick's had an estate in Old Westbury on the north shore of Long Island. The estate featured an 1888 Georgian revival manor house with 18 rooms that was updated by architect James O'Connor in the 1930s. After his widow's death in 2004, the estate was sold and subdivided.

Bostwick died in 1980 at age 79 at his home in Old Westbury. His funeral was held at the Church of the Advent in Westbury.
