= Shelburne Farms =

Nonprofit education center in Vermont, US

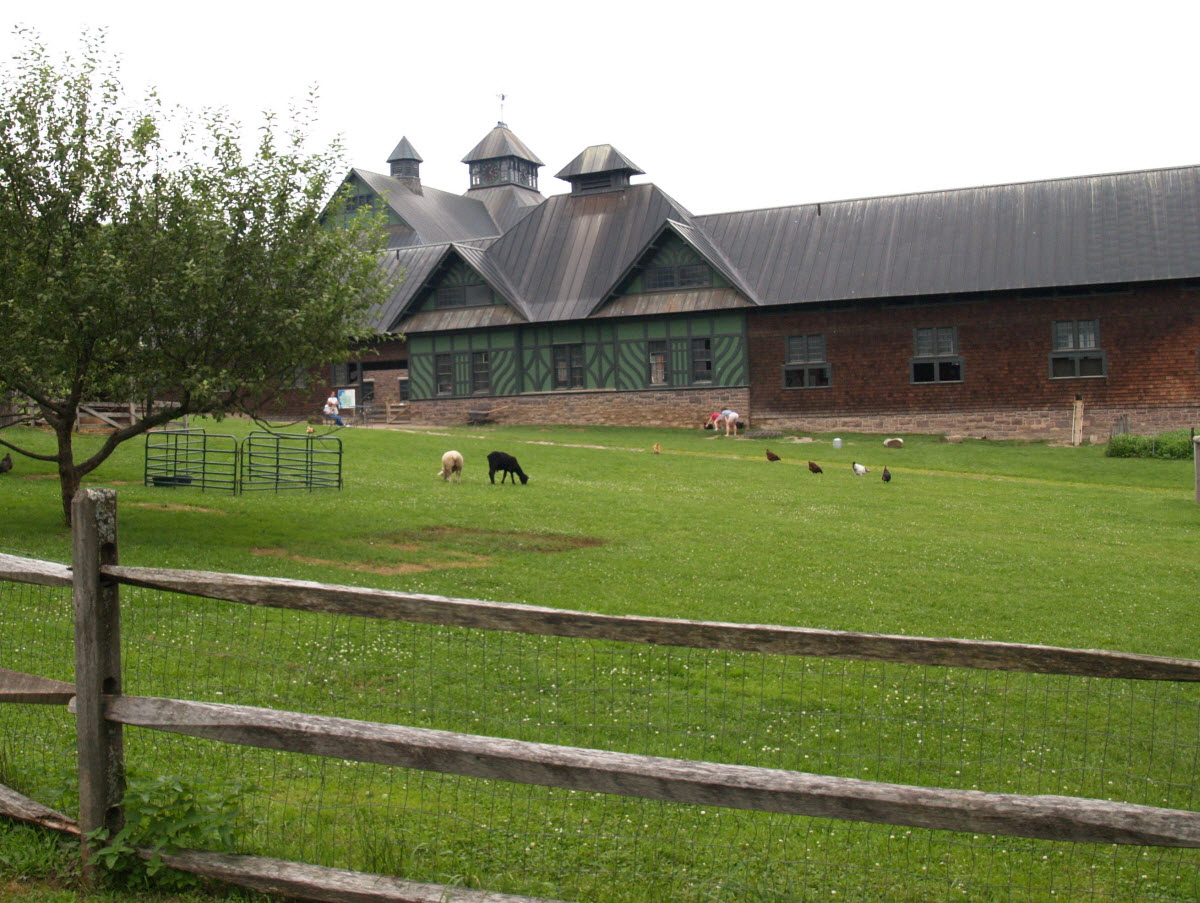
- Established: 1972
- Location: Shelburne, Vermont
- Coordinates: 44°23′31.69″N 73°15′26.04″W
- Type: Nonprofit
- President: Alec Webb
- Website: shelburnefarms.org
- Shelburne Farms
- U.S. National Register of Historic Places
- U.S. National Historic Landmark District
- Area: 1,339 acres (542 ha)
- Built: 1887
- Architect: Robert Henderson Robertson
- Architectural style: Tudor Revival, Queen Anne
- NRHP reference No.: 80000330

Significant dates
- Added to NRHP: August 11, 1980
- Designated NHLD: January 3, 2001

Shelburne Farms is a nonprofit education center for sustainability, 1,400-acre (570 ha) working farm, and National Historic Landmark on the shores of Lake Champlain in Shelburne, Vermont. The property is nationally significant as a well-preserved example of a Gilded Age "ornamental farm", developed in the late 19th century with architecture by Robert Henderson Robertson and landscaping by Frederick Law Olmsted.

== Description and history ==
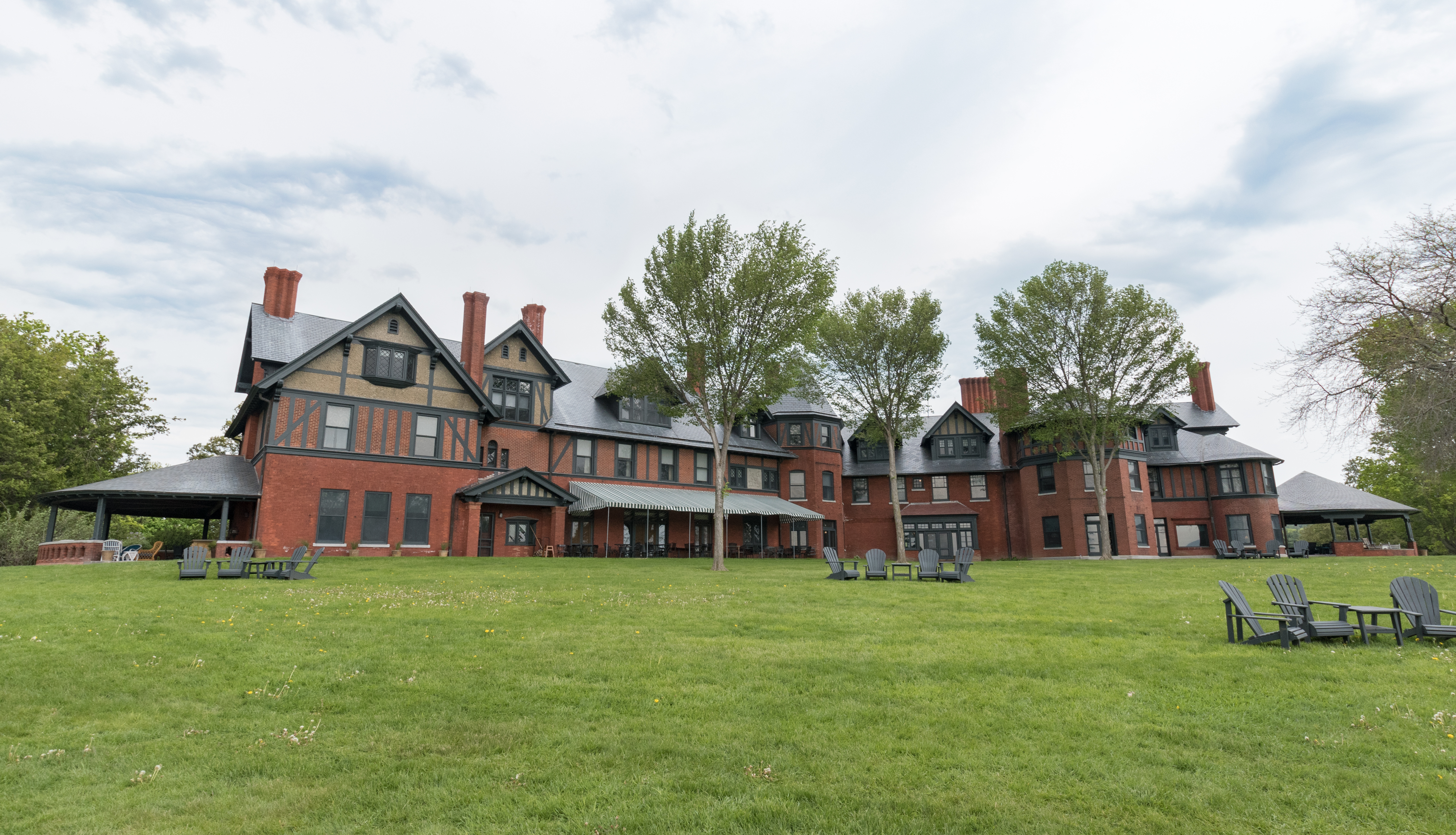
Historic inn

Shelburne Farms was created in 1886 by Dr. William Seward Webb and Eliza Osgood Vanderbilt Webb as a model agricultural estate, using money inherited from railroad magnate William Henry Vanderbilt. They commissioned landscape architect Frederick Law Olmsted to guide the layout of 3,800 acres (1,500 ha) of farm, field and forest, and New York architect Robert Henderson Robertson, to design the buildings. The estate was created by purchasing a large number of mostly agricultural properties, and then adapting the existing roads and lanes (some of which were public ways the Webbs petitioned to have closed) to fulfill the Webbs' vision for the estate. The property was listed on the National Register of Historic Places in 1980, and was designated a National Historic Landmark District in 2001.

Shelburne Farms was incorporated as a nonprofit educational organization in 1972 by descendants of the Webbs. Nearly 400 acres (160 ha) of sustainably managed woodlands received Green Certification from the Forest Stewardship Council in 1998. The farm's grass-based dairy supports a herd of 125 purebred, registered Brown Swiss cows. Their milk is made into farmhouse cheddar cheese. The farm serves as an educational resource by practicing rural land use that is environmentally, economically and culturally sustainable.

== See also ==
- List of National Historic Landmarks in Vermont
- National Register of Historic Places listings in Chittenden County, Vermont
