= William Seward Webb =

American businessman and inspector general

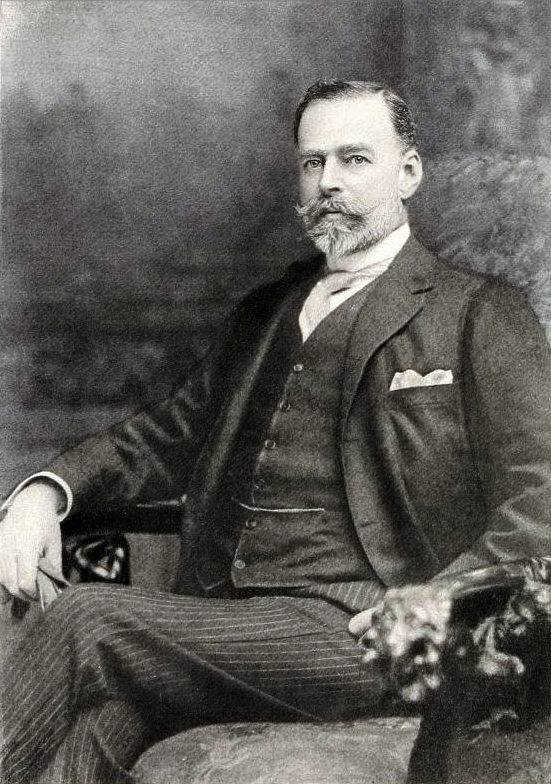

Member of the Vermont House of Representatives from Shelburne
- In office 1896–1900
- Preceded by: Henry W. Tracy
- Succeeded by: William James Sheridan

Personal details
- Born: January 31, 1851 New York City, New York, U.S.
- Died: October 29, 1926 (aged 75) Shelburne, Vermont, U.S.
- Spouse: Eliza Osgood Vanderbilt (m. 1883)
- Children: Frederica Vanderbilt Webb; James Watson Webb II; William Seward Webb, Jr. Vanderbilt Webb
- Parent(s): James Watson Webb; Laura Virginia Cram
- Education: Columbia University College of Physicians and Surgeons
- Occupation: Entrepreneur, financier, gentleman farmer

William Seward Webb (January 31, 1851 – October 29, 1926) was a businessman, and inspector general of the Vermont militia with the rank of colonel. He was a founder and former president general of the Sons of the American Revolution.

== Early life ==
Webb was born on January 31, 1851, to James Watson Webb and Laura Virginia (née Cram) Webb (1826–1890). Among his many siblings were Alexander Stewart Webb, a noted Civil War general who married Anna Elizabeth Remsen; Henry Walter Webb, also a railway executive who married Amelia Howard Griswold; and George Creighton Webb, a Yale Law School graduate and attorney in New York with Saunders, Webb & Worcester who did not marry.

He studied medicine in Vienna, Paris and Berlin. Returning to America, he entered the Columbia University College of Physicians and Surgeons and graduated from there in 1875. In 1881, he married Eliza Osgood Vanderbilt, the daughter of William Henry Vanderbilt. For several years Webb practiced medicine; then forsook the profession for finance at the behest of his wife's family, establishing the Wall Street firm of W. S. Webb & Co.

== Career ==
In 1883, Webster Wagner, the president of the Wagner Palace Car Company, was crushed between two of his own railroad cars. William Vanderbilt owned a controlling interest in the company, and asked his new son-in-law to take over the firm. William Seward invited his brother H. Walter Webb to join him, which started them both on careers in the railroad business. The Wagner Palace Car Company was subsequently merged with the Pullman Company.

Webb later became president of the Fulton Chain Railway Company, the Fulton Navigation Company and the Raquette Lake Transportation Company. He was the builder and President of the Mohawk and Malone Railway. His railroads were instrumental in opening the Adirondacks to the tourism rush of the mid-to-late 19th century and beyond.

=== Public service ===
Webb served as inspector general of rifle practice for the Vermont militia with the rank of colonel. A Republican, he won election to the Vermont House of Representatives in 1896 and 1898.

In 1902, he intended to campaign for the Republican nomination for Governor of Vermont, but left the race in favor of Percival Clement. Clement lost the nomination to John G. McCullough, who went on to win the general election.

== Personal life ==
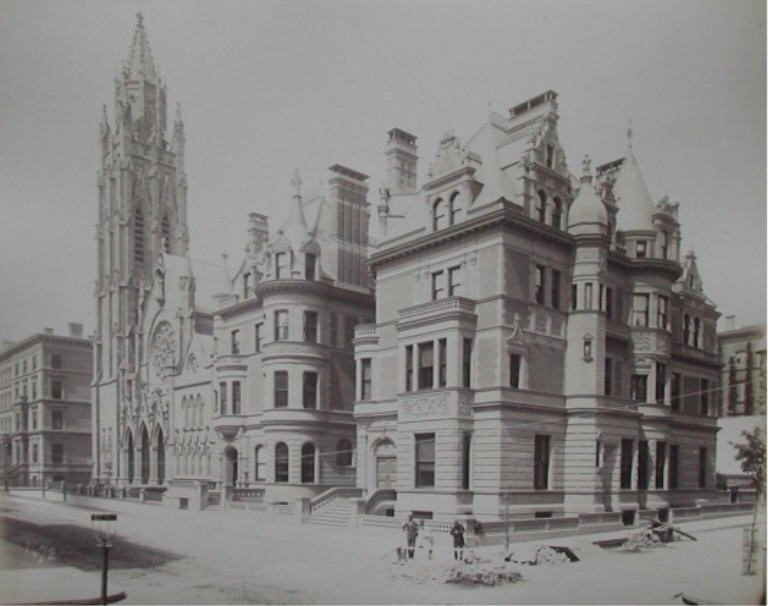
680 Fifth Avenue mansion

In 1883, he married Eliza Osgood Vanderbilt, daughter of railroad magnate William H. Vanderbilt. They were the parents of:

- Frederica Webb, married Ralph Pulitzer.
- J. Watson Webb II, married Electra Havemeyer Webb.
- William Seward Webb Jr. (1887–1956), married Gertrude Emily Gaynor, daughter of William Jay Gaynor.
- Vanderbilt Seward Webb (1891–1956), name partner of Patterson Belknap Webb & Tyler, married Aileen Osborn.

He died on October 29, 1926, and was survived by his wife, three sons, and one daughter.

=== Legacy ===
The Webbs lived for thirty years at 680 Fifth Avenue, New York. This house, a wedding gift from William H. Vanderbilt to his daughter, was sold in 1913 to John D. Rockefeller. The Webb property at Shelburne, Vermont, was created from more than thirty separate farms on the shores of Lake Champlain and is known today as Shelburne Farms. The property is a National Historic Landmark, and one of the main concert sites of the Vermont Mozart Festival. The former Webb estate has stunning views and some of the grandest barns of any Gilded Age property.

A great horseman, Dr. Webb had a large collection of carriages, many of which are on display today at the Shelburne Museum. The Vanderbilt Webb's other country estate was an Adirondack Great Camp named NeHaSane, a game preserve of some 200,000 acres (800 km^{2}), most of which was later donated to the State of New York to become part of the Adirondack Park. The town of Webb, New York in the park is named after him.

== Published works ==
- California and Alaska and over the Canadian Pacific Railway (1890)
- Historical notes of the organization of societies of sons of the American Revolution, with a list of national and state officers, and illustrated with designs showing the insignia of the order, form of application for membership, certificates, etc. (1890)
- Shelburne Farms Stud: of English Hackneys, harness and saddle horses, ponies and trotters (1893)
