= Bostwick Railroad =

The Bostwick Railroad was constructed in 1907 between Bostwick, Georgia and Apalachee, Georgia in the United States. It failed in 1912 and was purchased by the Greene County Railroad.
