= Dorothy Stokes Bostwick =

American artist (1899–2001)

- Born: Dorothy Stokes Bostwick; March 26, 1899; Manhattan, New York, U.S.
- Died: February 16, 2001 (aged 101); Old Westbury, New York, U.S.
- Spouses: W. T. Sampson Smith (m. 1922–1942) Joseph Campbell (m. 1950–1984)
- Children: 4
- Parent(s): Albert Carlton Bostwick Sr. Mary Lillian Stokes
- Relatives: A.C. Bostwick Jr. (brother); Lillian Bostwick (sister); Dunbar Bostwick (brother); Pete Bostwick (brother)

Dorothy Stokes Smith Campbell (née Bostwick; March 26, 1899 – February 16, 2001) was an American heiress and an artist and author who became one of the first women in the United States to hold a helicopter pilot's license.

== Early life ==
Dorothy Stokes Bostwick was born in Manhattan on March 26, 1899. She was the eldest of five children born to Mary Lillian (née Stokes) Bostwick and Albert Carlton Bostwick Sr. Among her younger siblings was Albert C. Bostwick Jr., Lillian Bostwick Phipps, Dunbar Bostwick, and Pete Bostwick. Her father, a banker and sportsman, set early automobile speed records. After Albert Sr.'s death in 1911, her mother remarried in 1914 to Fitch Gilbert Jr., a Harvard and Columbia Law School graduate and farmer and they lived at 801 Fifth Avenue.

Her maternal grandfather, Henry Bolter Stokes, was president of the Manhattan Life Insurance Company, and her paternal grandfather, Jabez Bostwick, was a founder and treasurer of the Standard Oil and a partner of John D. Rockefeller.

On the death of her father in 1911, Dorothy and her siblings inherited a sizeable fortune and upon the death of her grandmother, Helen Celia (née Ford) Bostwick, she received a considerable amount more.

== Career ==
Dorothy formally studied art and became an accomplished painter and sculptor. Her work was featured in shows across Washington and Sarasota and in Cooperstown, where she was a co-founder of the Cooperstown Art Association. In addition to being in the permanent collection of the Art Association, it is also in the collections of the Mystic Seaport Museum in Mystic, Connecticut and the Smithy Pioneer Gallery. Also an author, Dorothy wrote and illustrated "Passing Thoughts," a collection of her own poetry and drawings published in the early 1990s.

She was also a skilled sailor and an aviation buff, in particular with the autogyro, a precursor to the modern helicopter. She became one of the first women in the United States to hold a helicopter pilot's license in 1942.

== Personal life ==
On March 7, 1922, Bostwick was first married to William Thomas Sampson Smith (1900–1983) at Christ Church in Gilbertsville, New York (a town founded by her stepfather's family). Smith's grandfather was the late Rear Admiral William T. Sampson, the Commander-in-Chief, North Atlantic Squadron and the Superintendent of the U.S. Naval Academy. Smith was a builder of Star Class racing yachts and, together, they were a fixture on the domestic and international racing circuit throughout the 1920s and 1930s. Before their 1942 divorce, they lived at Leatherstocking Farm (on an 80-acre estate with a shingle style mansion designed by Squires & Wynkoop) on Otsego Lake and in Short Hills, New Jersey, and were the parents of:

- Suzanne Bostwick Smith, who married Lt. John Van Benschoten Dean in 1942.
- Dorothy Sampson Smith (1924–2010), who married Henry Rudkin Jr., son of Margaret Rudkin, who founded and owned Pepperidge Farm Inc.
- William Thomas Sampson Smith Jr. (1928–1994), who married Judith Melrose Johnston in 1954.
- Henry Stokes Smith (1932–1932), who died in infancy.

In 1950, she was married to Joseph Campbell (1900–1984), the vice-president and treasurer of Columbia University. In 1953, they moved to Washington, D.C. when Campbell began serving as Atomic Energy Commissioner, until he was appointed by President Dwight D. Eisenhower to Comptroller General of the United States in 1953.

Her first husband died in 1983 and her second husband Campbell died at their home in Sarasota, Florida in 1984. Dorothy died in Sarasota on February 16, 2001.
