= Edwin Etherington =

American writer, lawyer, & civil rights advocate (1924-2001)

Edwin Deacon Etherington
- Edwin Etherington
- Born: December 25, 1924; Bayonne, New Jersey, United States
- Died: January 8, 2001 (aged 76)
- Education: Wesleyan University; Yale University Law School
- Occupations: writer, lawyer
- Military career
- Allegiance: United States
- Branch: United States Army
- Service years: 1941-1945
- Conflicts: World War II

Edwin Deacon (Ted) Etherington (December 25, 1924 – January 8, 2001) was an American writer, lawyer, and civil rights advocate, who served as president of the American Stock Exchange and Wesleyan University.

== Biography ==
Etherington was born in Bayonne, New Jersey. He served in the Army during World War II, then graduated from Wesleyan in 1948 with a bachelor's degree in creative writing, and attended Yale University Law School, where he received a degree in 1952.

As a lawyer he specialized in banking and brokerage before working at the New York Stock Exchange, where he became vice-president.

Its reputation recently damaged by charges of mismanagement, in 1962 the American Stock Exchange named Etherington its president. At AMEX he was credited with improving opportunities for minorities and women. In 1967 he became president of Wesleyan, where he increased minority enrollment and restored a coeducational environment. Etherington was instrumental in the creation of the university's Center for African American Studies, its Center for the Arts, and a scholarship program for Connecticut community college graduates that bears his name.

In 1970 Etherington left Wesleyan to make an unsuccessful run for the United States Senate as a Republican candidate from Connecticut. He was appointed by President Richard M. Nixon to head the National Center for Voluntary Action.
