= Dunbar Bostwick =

American ice hockey player, businessman, pilot, and horseman

Dunbar Wright Bostwick
- Born: January 10, 1908; Manhattan, New York, United States
- Died: January 25, 2006 (aged 98); Shelburne, Vermont, United States
- Education: St. Paul's School (Concord, New Hampshire), Yale University
- Occupations: Polo player, Racehorse owner/breeder/trainer/driver
- Spouse: Electra Webb
- Children: 4
- Relatives: Siblings: Dorothy Stokes (1899–2001); Albert C. Jr. (1901–1980); Lillian Stokes (1906–1987); George H. "Pete" (1909–1982)

Dunbar Wright Bostwick (January 10, 1908 – January 25, 2006) was an American businessman, hockey player, pilot and horseman.

== Biography ==
Dunbar Bostwick was the fourth child of Albert Carlton Bostwick Sr. and Mary Lillian Stokes. His father was a prominent New York automobile and yacht racer. His grandfather, Jabez A. Bostwick, was a partner of John D. Rockefeller and a founder and treasurer of the Standard Oil Trust.

He attended St. Paul's School (Concord, New Hampshire) and Yale University. During his time at Yale, he served as co-captain of the famous 1932 hockey team and declined an invitation to play in the 1932 Winter Olympics in Lake Placid.

In 1932, Bostwick married Electra Webb, a great-granddaughter of Cornelius Vanderbilt, and daughter of James Watson Webb, Sr. and Electra Havemeyer Webb. The couple had four daughters and spent their time primarily between New York, NY, Old Westbury, NY, Shelburne, VT and Aiken, SC.

== Military service ==
During World War II, Bostwick served in London, England with the U.S. Army Air Corps. He returned as a Lieutenant Colonel with a Bronze Star and a Belgian Croix de Guerre for his help in the organization of the Normandy Invasion in 1944.

== Polo career ==
Bostwick's siblings included Dorothy Stokes Bostwick, Albert C. Bostwick, Jr., Lillian Bostwick Phipps and Pete Bostwick. Like his siblings, Bostwick was a competitive horseman, who competed in polo and Harness racing events all over the country. He earned a 6-goal polo handicap and played for the Aiken Knights and the Bostwick Field polo teams during the 1930s.

During this time, Bostwick created Bostwick Field with his siblings Pete Bostwick and Lillian Bostwick Phipps. During the Great Depression, the Bostwicks believed that everyone should be able to watch polo without being overcharged, which inspired Bostwick Field. The slogan of the field was "Polo for the Populace."

== Harness Racing career ==
After he gave up polo in the 1940s, Bostwick turned to harness racing. He bred, trained and raced many successful Standardbred trotters from his Bostwick Stables in Shelburne, Vermont.

When his most famous horse, Chris Spencer, went lame, Bostwick swam the horse twice a day in Lake Champlain. Eventually, the horse was back in racing condition and went on to win important races including the 1949 American Trotting Championship and Golden West Trot and the 1950 Roosevelt Trot. Chris Spencer was inducted into the United States Harness Racing Hall of Fame in 1979. Chris Spencer was also the first horse to fly on an airplane, from Vermont to California to win the Hollywood Stakes race in 1952.

Bostwick was a member of the United States Harness Racing Hall of Fame and founded the Saratoga Harness Racing Association and the Aiken Mile Track.

Throughout his life, Bostwick was engaged in multiple business ventures. He invented the magnetic snap barrier, an early gate that preceded current moving gates used at modern horse racetracks. Additionally, he served on the boards of the Aviation Instrument Manufacturing Corporation and Helio Aircraft Corporation, among others.

Dunbar Bostwick died in 2006 at age 98 at his home in Shelburne, Vermont.
