= Lillian Bostwick Phipps =

American socialite and racehorse owner

Lillian Phipps
- Born: Lillian Stokes Bostwick; July 9, 1906; New York City, New York, U.S.
- Died: November 27, 1987 (aged 81); Summerville, South Carolina, U.S.
- Occupations: Businesswoman, racehorse owner/breeder
- Spouses: Robert McKim (m. 1928; div. 1937) Ogden Phipps (m. 1937)
- Children: Mary Maude McKim; Lillian Lee McKim; Florence Fitch McKim; Ogden Mills Phipps; Cynthia Phipps
- Parent(s): Mary Stokes; Albert Carlton Bostwick
- Relatives: Dorothy Stokes Bostwick (sister); Jabez A. Bostwick (grandfather)

Lillian Stokes Bostwick Phipps (July 9, 1906 – November 27, 1987) was an American socialite and owner of Thoroughbred steeplechase racehorses.

== Early life ==
Lillian Stokes Bostwick was born in New York City, the daughter of Mary Stokes and Albert Carlton Bostwick (1876-1911), her wealthy grandfather, Jabez A. Bostwick (1830–1892), was one of John D. Rockefeller's founding partners in the Standard Oil Company.

Lillian Bostwick was raised in a Fifth Avenue mansion in New York City and as a young woman was listed in the 1930 New York Social Blue Book. Her father was a horseman and polo player whose influence on her and brothers George Herbert Bostwick, Dunbar and Albert Jr. led to them becoming involved with the sport of horse racing. In 1942, her only sister, Dorothy (1899-2001), became the first American woman to hold a helicopter pilot's license.

== Career ==
In the 1930s, Lillian Bostwick and brothers Pete and Dunbar built and operated Bostwick Field in Old Westbury, New York where they hosted international polo matches.

While her husband successfully invested in Thoroughbred horses for flat racing, Lillian Bostwick Phipps purchased and raced a number of steeplechase racers. She owned Neji and Oedipus, two very prominent horses that were voted American Steepchase Champions six times in all, and who were both inducted into the U.S. Racing Hall of Fame. Mrs. Phipps won the American Grand National eight times with Oedipus (1951), Neji (1955, 1957, 1958), Mako (1965), Top Bid (1973), Straight and True (1976), and Le Ronceray (1987).

== Personal life ==
In 1928, Lillian married Robert V. McKim of Aiken, South Carolina, at the Church of the Transfiguration. Before their divorce in September 1937, the couple had three daughters:

- Mary Maude McKim
- Lillian Lee McKim (1931–2013), the fashion designer better known as Lilly Pulitzer, who was married to Herbert Pulitzer, and later, Enrique Rousseau.
- Florence Fitch McKim, who was married to Nelson Doubleday Jr. (1933–2015).

In November 1937, she wed Court tennis champion and Thoroughbred breeder/owner Ogden Phipps (1908-2002), a member of the prominent Phipps family and nephew of Ogden L. Mills, the former United States Secretary of the Treasury, at St. Bartholomew's Church. Ogden and Lillian had two more children:

- Ogden Mills Phipps (1940-2016)
- Cynthia Phipps (1945-2007), who died as a result of injuries sustained in a fire in her Manhattan apartment.

Phipps and her husband maintained residences in New York City, Saratoga Springs, NY, Florida and at Summerville, South Carolina where she died in 1987. Lillian was buried in the Bostwick Mausoleum, in Woodlawn Cemetery, Bronx, New York.

=== Philanthropy ===
A community benefactor, Lillian Bostwick Phipps served on the Board of Directors of the Visiting Nurse Service of New York, the Metropolitan Opera Association, and the Saratoga Performing Arts Center of which she was also its Chairperson.

Her interior design team of Robert Denning & Vincent Fourcade from the inception of their firm in 1960 had been involved with acquisitions and style in all of their fifteen homes and she has been credited with playing a significant role in launching the team.
