= Sarah Bostwick =

American artist (born 1979)

Sarah Bostwick (born 1979 in Ridgefield, Connecticut) is an American artist, known for her architecture or landscape inspired, minimal, cast and carved drawings.

== Biography ==
Sarah Bostwick received a BFA in 2001 from Rhode Island School of Design in Printmaking. Currently she is in several permanent collections, including; The Progressive Art Collection of San Francisco Museum Of Modern Art. She has been featured in Artforum, Flash Art, San Francisco Chronicle, and The New York Times.

In 2005, she was a MacDowell Colony Fellow. Bostwick was a 2011 fellow at the Roswell Artist-in-Residence Program, Roswell, New Mexico.

== Solo exhibitions ==
- 2002 :
  - Wagashi : An Installation of Japanese Confectionary, Califia Books, San Francisco (USA)
  - New Urban Landscape: Cast Mural, Adobe Books, San Francisco (USA)
- 2003 : Dimension, Adobe Books, San Francisco (USA)
- 2004 : Here we are here. Cast Drawings, Gregory Lind Gallery, San Francisco (USA)
- 2006 :
  - Grand Apartment, Inlaid Drawings, Gregory Lind Gallery, San Francisco (USA)
  - Cliffs and Canyons, Aldrich Contemporary Art Museum, Ridgefield (USA)
- 2008 : Landlord White, Gregory Lind Gallery, San Francisco (USA)
- 2009 : Passages, Meessen De Clercq, Brussels (Belgium)
- 2011 : Grey Area, Gregory Lind Gallery, San Francisco (USA)
- 2012 :
  - Sarah Bostwick, Roswell Museum and Art Center, Roswell, New Mexico (USA)
  - Actual Space, Meessen De Clercq, Brussels (Belgium)
- 2013 : Mayes Lumber, solo exhibition at Art Brussels, Meessen De Clercq, Brussels (Belgium)

== Sources ==
- Palm, Kristin (November 1, 2006). "Sarah Bostwick at Gregory Lind Gallery". Artweek.
- Mayfield, Signe. "Sarah Bostwick @ Gregory Lind".
- Callico, Catherine (March 31, 2012). "5 bonnes raisons de voir les expos " Katrin Sigurdardottir-Sarah Bostwick-Car André"". Victoire: 16.
