= Eliza Osgood Vanderbilt Webb =

American heiress (1860–1936)

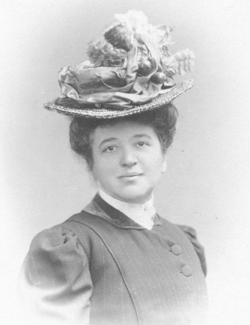
- Born: Eliza Osgood Vanderbilt; September 20, 1860; Staten Island, New York, U.S.
- Died: July 10, 1936 (aged 75); Shelburne, Vermont, U.S.
- Other names: Lila Vanderbilt Webb
- Education: Miss Porter's School
- Spouse: William Seward Webb (m. 1881; died 1926)
- Children: Frederica Vanderbilt Webb; James Watson Webb, Sr. William Seward Webb, Jr. Vanderbilt Webb
- Parent(s): William Henry Vanderbilt; Maria Kissam Vanderbilt
- Family: Vanderbilt

Eliza Osgood Vanderbilt Webb (September 20, 1860 – July 10, 1936) was an American heiress.

== Early life ==
Eliza Osgood Vanderbilt was born on September 20, 1860, in Staten Island. She was the youngest daughter and seventh child of William Henry Vanderbilt (1821–1885) and Maria Louisa (Kissam) Vanderbilt. Her elder siblings were Cornelius Vanderbilt II, Margaret Louisa Vanderbilt Shepard, William Kissam Vanderbilt, Frederick William Vanderbilt, Florence Adele Vanderbilt Twombly, and Emily Thorn Vanderbilt. Her younger brother was George Washington Vanderbilt II, builder of the Biltmore Estate.

Her maternal grandparents were Rev. Samuel Kissam and the former Margaret Hamilton Adams. Her grandfather was business magnate Cornelius Vanderbilt, owner of the New York Central Railroad.

Eliza attended Miss Porter's School in Farmington, Connecticut.

== Personal life ==
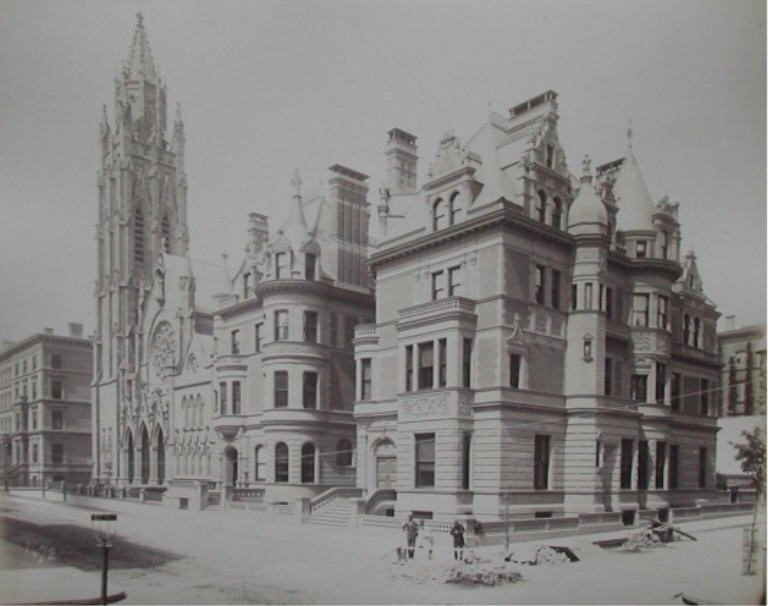
The Webbs’ New York residence at 680 Fifth Avenue.

On December 20, 1881, Vanderbilt married Dr. William Seward Webb (1851–1926) at St. Bartholomew's Episcopal Church in New York City. William was a physician and railroad executive who later became a member of the Vermont House of Representatives and was a founder, and president, of the Sons of the American Revolution. He was the son of James Watson Webb, a newspaper publisher (of the New York Courier and Enquirer) who served as U.S. Ambassador to Brazil, and his second wife, Laura Virginia (née Cram) Webb. Among his siblings was elder half-brother Civil War General Alexander S. Webb, and younger brother H. Walter Webb, also a railroad executive. Together, Eliza and William were the parents of four children:

- Frederica Vanderbilt Webb (1882–1949), married Ralph Pulitzer, son of Joseph Pulitzer.
- James Watson Webb II (1884–1960), married Electra Havemeyer, youngest child of Henry Osborne Havemeyer.
- William Seward Webb Jr. (1887–1956), married Gertrude Emily Gaynor, daughter of Mayor William Jay Gaynor.
- Vanderbilt Seward Webb (1891–1956), name partner of Patterson Belknap Webb & Tyler, married Aileen Osborn, daughter of art collector William Church Osborn.

She enjoyed playing golf, contract bridge, gardening, traveling and reading. She was one of the first female members of the Everglades Club in Palm Beach, Florida.

Vanderbilt died on July 10, 1936, at her home in Shelburne, Vermont. After a funeral at Trinity Church in Shelburne, she was buried alongside her late husband at Woodlawn Cemetery in the Bronx.

=== Residences ===
With her US$10 million inheritance, Vanderbilt bought and developed Shelburne Farms in Shelburne, Vermont, in 1899. She planned meals, hired servants, hosted guests, and took care of the interior decorating and garden design. She entertained at Shelburne Farms until her death in 1936. During his 1909 visit to Shelburne Farms, President William Howard Taft said her husband was absent because he was drunk.

In April 1923, Vanderbilt built a house on Dunbar Road in Palm Beach, Florida. Later, she built another house in Gulf Stream, Florida.
