= Jabez A. Bostwick =

American businessman (1830–1892)

- Bostwick, c.1890
- Born: Jabez Abel Bostwick; September 23, 1830; Delhi, New York, U.S.
- Died: August 16, 1892 (aged 61); Mamaroneck, New York, U.S.
- Resting place: Woodlawn Cemetery
- Known for: Co-founder of Standard Oil
- Spouse: Helen Celia Ford
- Children: 3
- Relatives: Joe Carstairs (granddaughter)

Jabez Abel Bostwick (September 23, 1830 – August 16, 1892) was an American businessman who was a founding partner of Standard Oil.

== Early life ==
Bostwick was born in Delhi, New York on September 23, 1830. He was a son of Abel Bostwick (1798–1861) and Sally (née Fitch) Bostwick (1797–1869). While still a boy, his family moved to a farm in Ohio. As a young man, Jabez Bostwick first worked in a hardware store then opened his own.

== Career ==
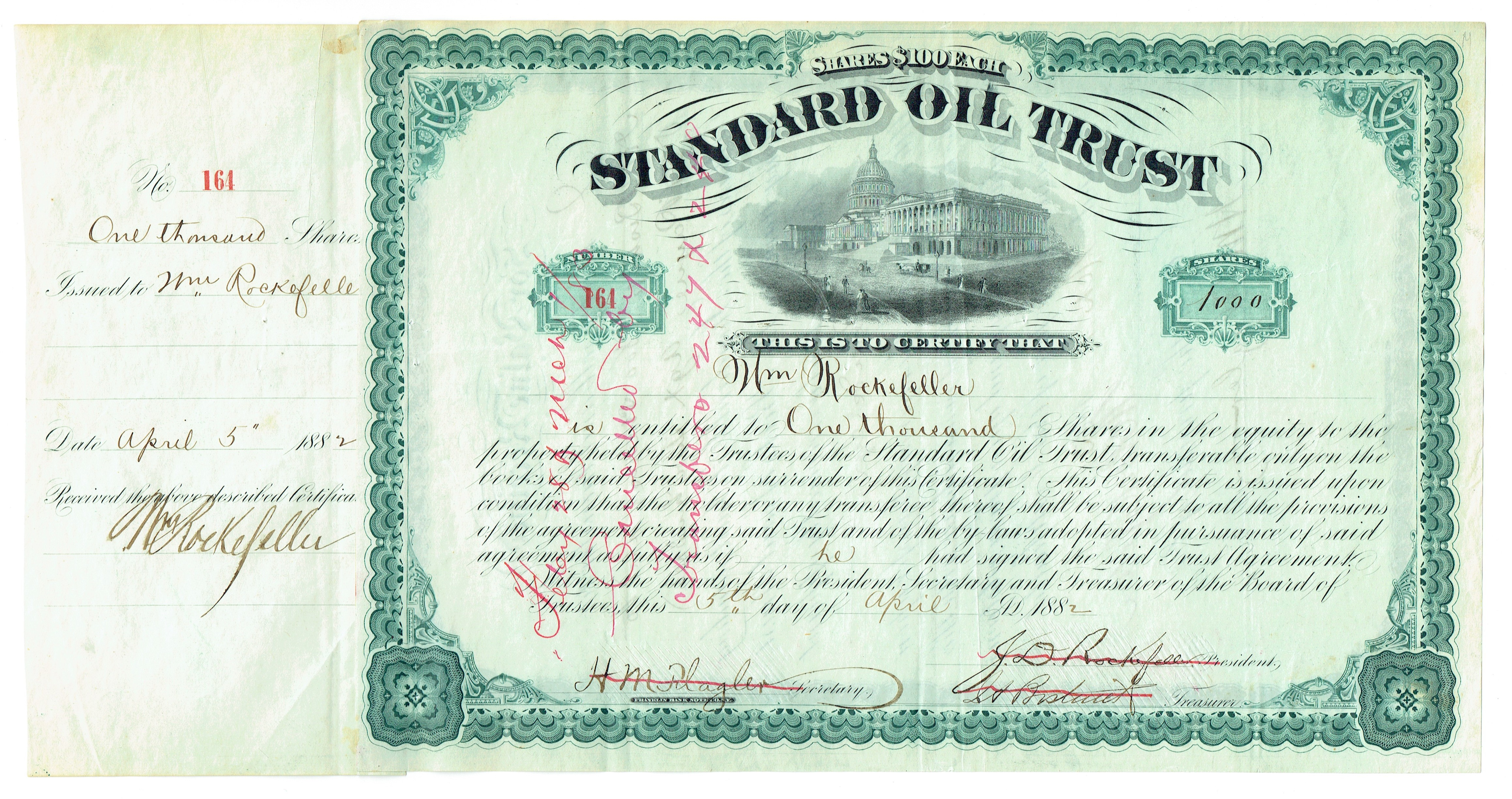
Share of the Standard Oil Trust dated April 5, 1882, signed by Jabez A. Bostwick as Treasurer

He next ventured into the cotton brokerage business in Cincinnati but soon moved to New York City where he became involved in the production side of the oil business through his firm, Tilford & Bostwick established in 1866. He bought out Tilford and in 1878 went into successful partnership with Henry Flagler and the Rockefeller brothers, John and William. Jabez Bostwick served as the Secretary-Treasurer of the Standard Oil Trust.

Jabez Bostwick was also a major shareholder and President of the New York and New England Railroad, a substantial shareholder in the Housatonic Railroad, a member of the New York Cotton Exchange, and who sat on numerous other corporate boards. In spite of the enormous wealth he obtained, Bostwick was known as a modest man of exemplary character who was a devout member of the Baptist Church. He donated money to his church and to educational institutions such as Wake Forest College in Winston-Salem, North Carolina and Richmond College in Richmond, Virginia.

== Personal life ==
Bostwick was married to Helen Celia Ford (1848–1920). Helen was the daughter of Smith Reed Ford and Frances Lee (née Fox) Ford. Together, they were the parents of:

- Nellie Ford Bostwick (1868–1906), who married Francis Lee Morrell (1863–1893) in 1887. After his death, she remarried to Hamilton Wilkes Cary (1862–1917) in 1895.
- Frances Evelyn "Fannie" Bostwick (1872–1921), who married Capt. Albert J. Carstairs (1862–1927) in 1895. They divorced and she married Francis Francis (1853–1928), son of English writer Francis Francis, in 1903. They also divorced and she married Count Roger Marie Felix Symon de Perigny (1875–1945) in 1915. They also divorced and she married Dr. Serge Abrahamovitch Voronoff (1866–1951) in 1919.
- Albert Carlton Bostwick (1878–1911), who married Marie Lillian Stokes (1877–1962). After his death, Marie remarried to Fitch Gilbert.

On August 16, 1892, Bostwick died in a freak stable fire at Friedheim, his summer residence in Mamaroneck in Westchester County. During the fire he tried to save his horses and carriages. As he and the stable hands pushed a coach from the carriage house he got overrun by a Private Coach weighing 2000/3000 lbs. His widow, Helen C. Bostwick, upon her death on April 27, 1920 left an estate per public record that was valued at $29,264,181.00, including nearly $20 million of Standard Oil stock.

=== Descendants ===
Through his daughter Fannie, he was the grandfather of Marion Barbara "Joe" Carstairs (1900–1993), a power boat racer known for her speed and her eccentric lifestyle, and Francis Francis (1906–1982), a pilot.

Through his son Albert, he was the grandfather of five grandchildren, including: Dorothy Stokes Bostwick (1899–2001), a philanthropist and the first woman to hold a helicopter pilot's license; Albert C. Bostwick Jr. (1901–1980), a thoroughbred racehorse owner and breeder whose horse Mate won the 1931 Preakness Stakes; Lillian Bostwick Phipps (1906–1987), an owner of Thoroughbred steeplechase racehorses who won the American Grand National eight times and who married Ogden Phipps; Dunbar Wright Bostwick (1908–2006), the chairman of the Aviation Instrument Manufacturing Corp. who was a standardbred horse breeder; and George Herbert "Pete" Bostwick (1909–1982), a Hall of Fame polo player, U.S. Racing Hall of Fame steeplechase jockey and horse trainer.

== See also ==
- Bostwick family
