= James Watson Webb =

American politician (1802–1884)

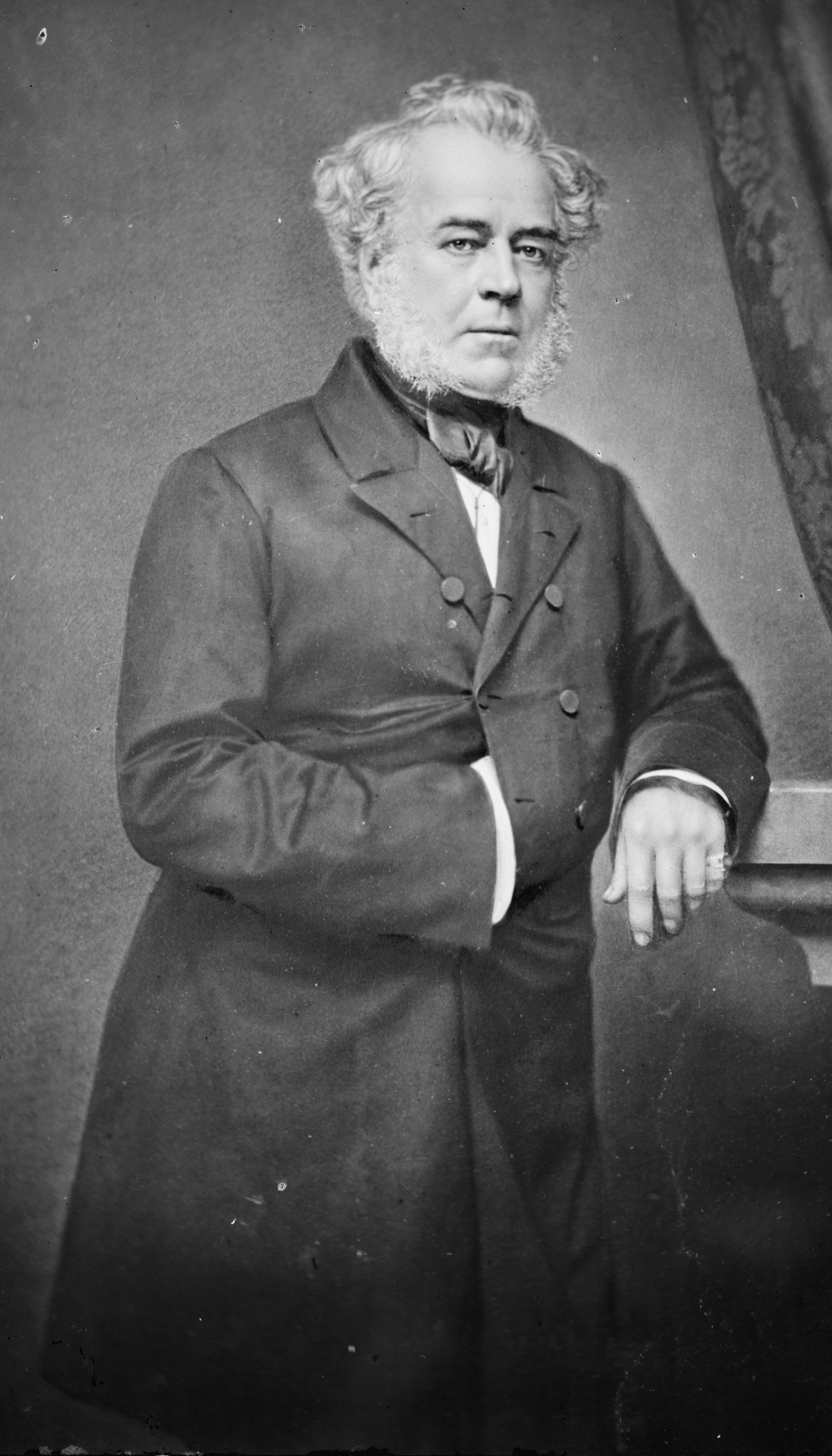
- Webb, between 1855 and 1865

United States Minister to Brazil
- In office October 21, 1861 – May 26, 1869
- President: Abraham Lincoln; Andrew Johnson; Ulysses S. Grant
- Preceded by: Richard K. Meade
- Succeeded by: Henry T. Blow

United States Chargé d'Affaires to Austria
- In office February 6, 1850 – May 8, 1850
- President: Zachary Taylor
- Preceded by: William H. Stiles
- Succeeded by: Charles J. McCurdy

Personal details
- Born: February 8, 1802 Claverack, New York, U.S.
- Died: June 7, 1884 (aged 82) New York City, New York, U.S.
- Party: Whig; Republican
- Spouses: Helen Lispenard Stewart (m. 1823; died 1848) Laura Virginia Cram (m. 1849)
- Children: 13, including Alexander, William, Walter
- Parent(s): Samuel Blachley Webb; Catherine Louisa Hogeboom
- Occupation: Diplomat, newspaper publisher

General James Watson Webb (February 8, 1802 – June 7, 1884) was an American diplomat, newspaper publisher and a New York politician in the Whig and Republican parties.

== Early life ==
Webb was born in Claverack, New York to Catherine Louisa (née Hogeboom) Webb (1765–1805) and Gen. Samuel Blachley Webb (1753–1807), a Revolutionary officer of distinction. At age 12, he moved to Cooperstown, New York to live with his brother-in-law and guardian, Judge George Morrell.

He entered the United States Army in August 1819, advanced to the grade of first lieutenant in 1823, and in the following year became assistant commissary of subsistence.

== Career ==
In September 1820, a party led by Lewis Cass, governor of the Michigan Territory, on its return from the exploration of the source waters of the Mississippi River, encountered Webb and a small group of soldiers at the mouth of the Black River in what is now Port Huron, Michigan. H.R. Schoolcraft, historian of the trip, said Webb and his men were returning to Fort Gratiot, a frontier outpost, with a boat full of freshly harvested watermelon.

In the fall of 1827, he resigned from the army to become a newspaper publisher, purchasing the Morning Courier which he published in the interest of General Jackson. In 1829, he purchased the New York Enquirer, which he consolidated with the Courier under the title of the New York Courier and Enquirer. He remained connected with this paper for more than 30 years. Historian Don C. Seitz wrote of those days:

James Watson Webb, of the horrendous Courier and Enquirer, who was a good deal of what was known in that day as a 'lady-killer' and Beau Brummel, sneered editorially, for example, at Greeley's ill-worn clothes. Just before indulging in this persiflage, Webb had been indicted, convicted and sentenced for acting as a second to Henry Clay in a duel with Tom Marshall. The term of duress was two years in Sing Sing, but Governor William H. Seward pardoned him before he went behind bars, in return for which Webb named one of his sons "William Seward Webb".

In 1834, Webb used the Courier and Enquirer to coin the name of a new political party: the Whigs. Webb had formerly been a supporter of Jackson, but no longer. That same year he recycled or invented extravagant rumors of miscegenation, that the abolitionists had counselled their daughters to marry blacks, and Lewis Tappan had divorced his wife to marry a black woman, and that the Presbyterian minister Henry Ludlow was conducting interracial marriages, which fueled the organized mob violence of New York's anti-abolitionist riots that June.

=== Diplomatic career ===
In 1849, Webb was appointed minister to Austria, but the appointment was not confirmed. In 1851, he was appointed engineer-in-chief for the State of New York with the rank of Brigadier General, but refused to accept the appointment.

In 1861, he was appointed minister to Ottoman Empire, but even though it had been confirmed by the United States Senate, he declined. According to biographer Glyndon Van Deusen, "Webb, an inveterate beggar for office, wanted a diplomatic appointment that would be lucrative."

Shortly afterward, Webb was appointed minister to Brazil and served in that position for eight years, resigning when he was accused of extorting a large sum of money from the Brazilian government. He tried to sever US ties with the country without Washington's knowledge. At Paris in 1864, Webb claimed he was instrumental to negotiating a secret treaty with Emperor Napoleon III for the removal of French troops from Mexico.

Abraham Lincoln's biographer, Carl Sandburg, wrote that Webb "believed that Lincoln should have appointed him major general, rating himself a grand strategist, having fought white men in duels and red men in frontier war." In 1869, he resigned the mission to Brazil and returned to live in New York.

== Personal life ==
On July 1, 1823, Webb was married to Helen Lispenard Stewart (1805–1848). Helen was the daughter of Irish born merchant Alexander L. Stewart and Sarah Amelia (née Lispenard) Stewart (the granddaughter of Leonard Lispenard). Before her death in 1848, they were the parents of:

- Robert Stewart Webb (1824–1899), a publisher who married Mary Van Horne Clarkson (d. 1880) and Frances (née Morgan) Starkweather.(d. 1912).
- Lispenard Stewart (1825–1828), who died young.
- Helen Matilda Webb (1827–1896), who married Nathan Denison Morgan (d. 1895).
- Artemesia Barclay Webb (1829–1830), who died young.
- Catherine Louisa Webb (1830–1918), who married James Gilchrist Benton (1820–1881) in 1859.
- Francis Watson Webb (1832–1832), who died young.
- Watson Webb (1833–1876), the chief of staff to Union Army General Henry Jackson Hunt. He married Mary Parsons of Hartford.
- Alexander Stewart Webb (1835–1911), who was a noted Civil War general who married Anna Elizabeth Remsen (1837–1912).

On November 9, 1849, he married Laura Virginia Cram (1826–1890), the daughter of Jacob and Lydia (née Tucker) Cram. Webb lived for a time at the present-day 7 Pokahoe Drive in Sleepy Hollow, New York, a house that was sold by him to the former New York City mayor Ambrose Kingsland and was later owned by John C. Frémont (the house is currently a private residence). Together, they were the parents of:

- William Seward Webb (1851–1926), a railway executive who married Eliza Osgood Vanderbilt (1860–1936), the daughter of William H. Vanderbilt.
- Sarah Augusta Webb (1851–1909), William's twin. In 1872, married William Adam Singer (1834–1914), oldest son of Isaac Singer
- Henry Walter Webb (1852–1900), also a railway executive who married Amelia Howard Griswold (1856–1910).
- George Creighton Webb (1854–1948), a Yale Law School graduate and attorney in New York with Saunders, Webb & Worcester who did not marry.
- Jacob Louis Webb (1855–1928), an artist who did not marry.
- Francis Egerton Webb (1859–1942), who married Mary Welsh Randolph (1868–1962), the daughter of banker Edmund Dutilh Randolph and niece of Maj. Gen. Wallace F. Randolph.

Webb died in New York City on June 7, 1884, surrounded by his children. Webb was buried at Woodlawn Cemetery, The Bronx.

== Published works ==
Webb published the following:

- Altowan, or Incidents of Life and Adventure in the Rocky Mountains (1846)
- Slavery and its Tendencies (1856)
- National Currency, a pamphlet (1875)

Diplomatic posts
Preceded by Richard K. Meade	United States Minister to Brazil; October 21, 1861 – May 26, 1869	Succeeded by Henry T. Blow
