= Manhattan Life Insurance Company =

American life insurance company

ManhattanLife
- Type: Privately held company
- Industry: Life insurance Financial services
- Founded: 1850; 176 years ago
- Headquarters: Houston, Texas, United States
- Area served: United States
- Products: Supplemental health and life insurance, annuities
- Website: www.manhattanlife.com

ManhattanLife (originally The Manhattan Life Insurance Company), is an American life insurance company domiciled in New York. It operates as a subsidiary of Manhattan Life Group in Houston, Texas. ManhattanLife is the brand name for plans, products, and services provided by one or more of the subsidiaries and affiliate companies of Manhattan Life Group Inc.

== History ==
=== Early years ===
Manhattan Life was incorporated on May 29, 1850, capitalizing on the recent trend of buying life insurance. Alonzo Alvord was its first President, a serial entrepreneur who started as a haberdasher, had been an insurance agent and insurance company officer for about three years, and dabbled in politics.

After the New York Deposit Law was passed in 1851, Manhattan Life created a joint-stock company. The goal was to provide corporate stability by creating a board of directors with a financial interest in the management. The new corporate structure protected the interests of policyholders by creating a mutual system whose profits belong to the insured. As an additional safeguard, one-half of the directors were to be policyholders whose premiums were at least $100 per year and all policyholders whose premiums equaled or exceeded $75 were entitled to vote. The company was successful and maintained a favorable record.

In early 1854, Manhattan Life issued its first group policy to a company that was transporting 700 labourers from China to the United States. Manhattan Life assumed a quarter of the financial risk, with other companies taking on the rest. The underwriting included a stipulation that a doctor be present on the ship, and that other needs pertaining to 'mortality' were available.

By the end of the voyage, 11 laborers had died of disease and three had jumped overboard. Manhattan Life Insurance paid out a quarter of the total loss and made a $432 profit.

=== Recent years ===
Between 1984 and 1986, the Manhattan Life parent company moved from a mixed stock and policy holder (mutual) model to a full stock ownership, moving Manhattan Life Insurance Company into the model with them. The company was formerly a subsidiary of the Manhattan Life Corporation.

A 2009 New York State department of Financial Services report found a number of policyholder disclosure violations. A follow-up examination by the same department in 2014 revealed that subsequent actions were taken by the company to satisfy each of the citations in a manner acceptable to the Department.

In June 2020, ManhattanLife has confirmed that it plans to grow its national existence with the purchase of Standard Life and Casualty Insurance Company.

== Headquarters ==
For over forty years, Manhattan Life was content to rent office space, which was considered cheaper than buying real estate. In 1892, a majority of its board of directors decided that the firm should have its own home office. The company purchased two old buildings. With two years left on its lease as 156 Broadway, it prepared to build. In 1894, the company completed the first skyscraper in New York, and the tallest building in the world at the time: the Manhattan Life Insurance Building at 66 Broadway. Demolition was set to start February 1, 1893, but was delayed several weeks by a dispute - sometimes violent - with a retail tenant. Though originally planned for fourteen floors, it was ultimately constructed with 18, but having a two-story setback on Broadway.

It was sold by the company in 1926, to Manufacturers Trust Company, though there is no indication that Manhattan Life moved out after the sale. The building was in turn sold two years later to Central Union Trust Company of New York, which promptly moved its headquarters there from down the block at 80 Broadway, so that it could sell the other building and adjacent buildings it owned to Irving Trust. Irving Trust built its much larger One Wall Street headquarters there, later buying 66 Broadway in order to build an extension of One Wall.
