= Joe Carstairs =

British motorboat racer

Marion Barbara "Joe" Carstairs
- Carstairs holding Lord Tod Wadley
- Born: Marion Barbara Carstairs; 1 February 1900; London, England, United Kingdom
- Died: 18 December 1993 (aged 93); Naples, Florida, United States
- Other names: Joe, Tuffy
- Occupations: Heiress, power boat racer
- Spouse: Count de Pret (1918–1921, annulment)

Marion Barbara 'Joe' Carstairs (1 February 1900 – 18 December 1993) was a wealthy British power boat racer known for her speed, eccentric lifestyle, and gender nonconformity. In the 1920s, she was known as the ‘fastest woman on water’.

== Biography ==
Carstairs was born in 1900 in Mayfair, London, the child of Frances (Fannie) Evelyn Bostwick, an American heiress who was the second child of Jabez Bostwick and his wife Helen. Joe Carstairs' legal father was Scottish army officer Captain Albert Carstairs, first of the Royal Irish Rifles and later the Princess of Wales's Own. Captain Carstairs re-enlisted with the Army the week before Joe was born; he and Evelyn divorced soon afterwards. At least one biographer has suggested that the captain may not have been Joe's biological father.

Carstairs' mother, an alcoholic and drug addict, later married Captain Francis Francis, with whom she had two more children, Evelyn (Sally) Francis and Francis Francis Jr. (Frank). She divorced Captain Francis to marry French count Roger de Périgny in 1915, but eventually left him because of his infidelity. Her fourth and last husband, whom she married in 1920, was Serge Voronoff, a Russian–French surgeon who became famous in the 1920s and 1930s for his practice of transplanting monkey testicle tissue into male humans for the claimed purpose of rejuvenation. For some years Evelyn had believed in Voronoff's theories, and she funded his research and acted as his laboratory assistant at the Collège de France in Paris. Evelyn died in March 1921. (Note: For the remainder of her life, Joe Carstairs claimed her mother had been murdered by her husband for her money. There was no evidence for this, but Voronoff's inheritance from Evelyn made him a wealthy man. See Summerscale (1997), p.34)

Carstairs had a rocky relationship with her mother, who sent her to the Low-Heywood School for Girls, a boarding school in Stamford, Connecticut, at the age of 11 due to her rebellious behaviour.

=== 1916–1934 ===
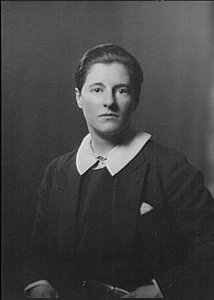
Joe Carstairs in 1928 or 1929, photographed by Arnold Genthe

Carstairs lived a colourful life. She usually dressed as a man; had tattooed arms; and loved machines, adventure and speed. Openly lesbian, she had numerous affairs with women, including Dolly Wilde—Oscar Wilde's niece and a fellow ambulance driver from Dublin with whom she had lived in Paris—and a string of actresses, most notably Greta Garbo, Tallulah Bankhead and Marlene Dietrich.

During World War I, Carstairs served in France with the American Red Cross, driving ambulances. After the war, she served with Britain’s Royal Army Service Corps in France, reburying the war dead; and in Dublin with the Women's Legion Mechanical Transport Section, which acted as transport for British officers during the Irish War of Independence.

Joe Carstairs married a childhood friend, the French aristocrat Count Jacques de Pret, on 7 January 1918 in Paris. The purpose of the marriage was simply to allow Carstairs’ access to her trust fund independently of her mother. The marriage was annulled immediately after her mother's death on the grounds of non-consummation. By means of a deed poll, she renounced her married name and resumed using the name Carstairs in February 1922.

In 1920, with three former colleagues from the Women's Legion Mechanical Transport Section, (Note: Bardie and Molly Coleclough, and Joan Mackern, who had been awarded the OBE for her war-services.) she started the X-Garage, a car-hire and chauffeuring service that featured a women-only staff of drivers and mechanics. Carstairs (and her friends and lovers) lived in a flat above the garage, which was situated near Cromwell Gardens in London's fashionable South Kensington district. Several of the X-Garage staff had served as drivers during the war and spoke French, German, or Italian. The cars and drivers could be hired for long-distance trips and the business specialised in taking grieving relatives for visits to war graves and former battlefields in France and Belgium. They were also hired for journeys within London and the garage had an arrangement with the Savoy Hotel to transport guests to the theatre or to shows. During the early 1920s, X-Garage cars were a familiar sight in London's fashionable circles.

In 1925, X-Garage closed and Carstairs inherited a fortune from Standard Oil via her mother and grandmother. The same year, she had her first speedboat built and named it Gwen after one of her former lovers, Gwen Farrar. But it was soon renamed Newg after capsizing on a test run. With it, she won her first trophy, the Southampton Water trophy.

She was also given a Steiff doll in 1925 by her girlfriend, Ruth Baldwin, naming it Lord Tod Wadley. She became exceptionally attached to this doll, keeping it with her until her death, although—unlike Donald Campbell's mascot 'Mr Whoppit'—she didn't take it into her speedboats for fear of losing it. She had clothes made for it in Savile Row and had its name placed with her own on the name plaque on the door of her London apartment.

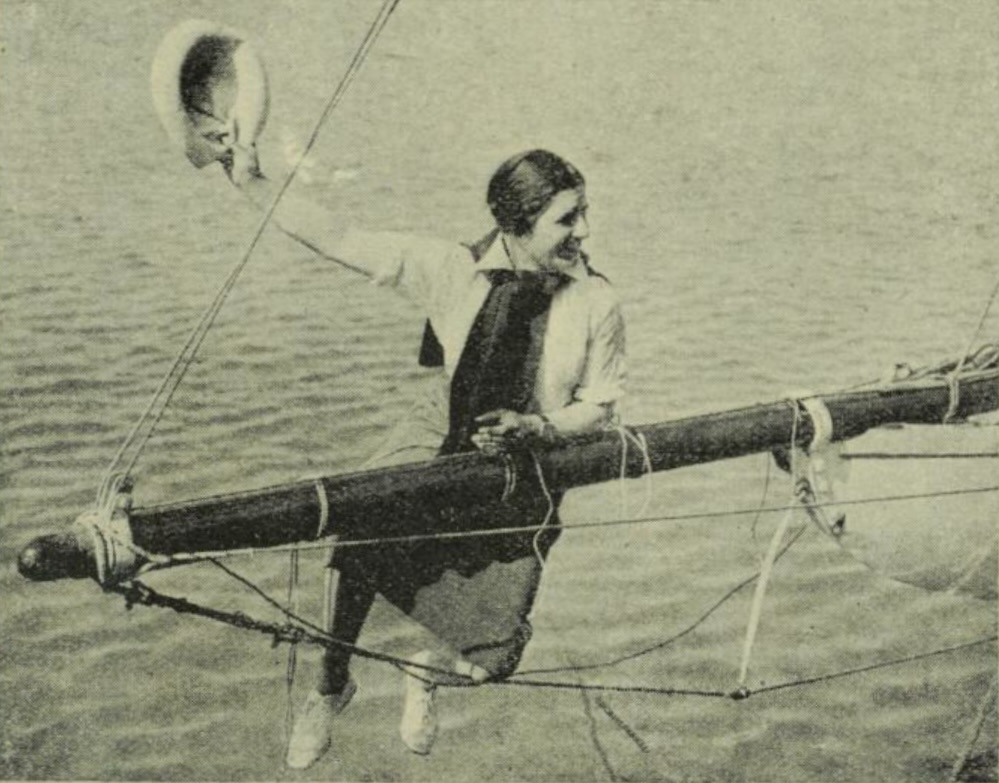
Carstairs on the bowsprit of her yacht Sonia in 1925

Between 1925 and 1930, Carstairs spent considerable time in powerboats and became a very successful racer winning many notable trophies – the Duke of York's Trophy in 1926, the Royal Motor Yacht Club International Race, the Daily Telegraph Cup, the Bestise Cup, and the Lucina cup. Still, the Harmsworth Trophy she longed for remained out of reach. Intrigued by the hydrofoil designs of Alexander Graham Bell and Casey Baldwin in Nova Scotia, Carstairs ordered a 30-foot (9.1 m) hydrofoil boat from the Bell Boatyard in Baddeck, Nova Scotia which was intended to achieve 115 miles per hour (185 km/h) and capture the Harmsworth Cup. However, circumstances caused her to withdraw and the boat was completed with a more economical engine delivering 57 miles per hour (92 km/h). During this time, the North American press erroneously began referring to her as "Betty," a nickname she loathed; she claimed that journalists used it out of spite.

Carstairs was known for her generosity towards friends. She was close to several male racing drivers and land speed record competitors, using her considerable wealth to assist them. She paid $10,000 of her money to fund the building of one of the Blue Bird land speed record cars for Sir Malcolm Campbell, who once described her as "the greatest sportsman I know." She was equally generous to John Cobb, whose record-breaking vehicle Railton Special was powered by the pair of engines from her powerboat Estelle V.

=== Later life: Whale Cay and Florida ===
In 1934, Carstairs invested $40,000 purchasing the island of Whale Cay in the Bahamas where she lavishly hosted guests such as Marlene Dietrich and the Duke and Duchess of Windsor. She constructed a great house for herself and her guests as well as a lighthouse, school, church, and cannery. She created an agricultural enterprise and employed hundreds of Bahamians, also building complexes for them. Carstairs considered herself the official ruler of the island, and made laws banning alcohol and adultery (but was less strict on domestic abuse), named all children born on the island, officiated marriages, and hired a private militia to protect the island. Although disapproving of racial segregation elsewhere, she also kept her black workers to their own beach.

Despite her strict rules for black Bahamian workers, sex, alcohol and drug use were frequent among the foreign guests who stayed in her villa on the island. One time, as a practical joke, she enacted a fake uprising of black workers to her foreign guests, stating: "The blacks are going to kill us all!", adding "Pansies first, women last".

She later expanded these properties by also buying the additional islands of Bird Cay, Cat Cay, Devil's Cay, half of Hoffman's Cay and a tract of land on Andros.

During this time, she also started writing poetry under the pseudonym of Hans Bernstein.

After selling Whale Cay in 1975, Carstairs moved to Miami, Florida.

Carstairs died in Naples, Florida in 1993 at the age of 93. The doll Lord Tod Wadley was cremated with her. Her ashes and those of Ruth Baldwin were buried in Oakland Cemetery in Sag Harbor, New York.

== In popular culture ==
- Season 5, Episode 2 of the Bad Gays podcast covers Carstairs' life.

== See also ==
- List of ambulance drivers during World War I
