= Mate (horse) =

American-bred Thoroughbred racehorse

- Sire: Prince Pal
- Grandsire: Prince Palatine
- Dam: Killashandra
- Damsire: Ambassador
- Sex: Stallion
- Foaled: 1928
- Country: United States
- Color: Chestnut
- Breeder: Albert C. Bostwick, Jr.
- Owner: Albert C. Bostwick, Jr.
- Trainer: James W. Healy
- Record: 75: 20-14-19
- Earnings: US$301,810

Major wins
- Spalding Lowe Jenkins Handicap (1930); Walden Stakes (1930); Breeders' Futurity Stakes (1930); Champagne Stakes (1930); Stanley Produce Stakes (1931); Thanksgiving Day Handicap (1931, 1933); Kenner Stakes (1931); Arlington Classic (1931); American Derby (1931); Bowie Handicap (1931); Challenge Stakes (1934) U.S. Triple Crown wins: Preakness Stakes (1931)
- Last updated on January 21, 2010

Mate (foaled 1928 in Kentucky) was an American Thoroughbred racehorse best known for winning the 1931 Preakness Stakes.

== Background ==
From modest parentage, Mate was bred and raced by Albert C. Bostwick, Jr., whose grandfather was a founding partner of Standard Oil. Mate was trained by Jim Healy and had to race against very strong opponents in 1930 and 1931 when he was part of what the Chicago Tribune newspaper called the "big four" in racing which included Twenty Grand, Jamestown, and Equipoise.

== Racing career ==
=== United States ===
At age two, Mate won several races including two from the most important for his age group, the Breeders' Futurity Stakes and the Champagne Stakes. The following year, in what was the first leg of the 1931 U.S. Triple Crown series, on May 9 Mate beat Twenty Grand to win Preakness Stakes while equaling the stakes record. That year's Kentucky Derby was then run on May 16 and won by Twenty Grand with Mate finishing third behind runner-up, Sweep All. He did not run in the Belmont Stakes but went on to win the prestigious American Derby in Chicago and beat Twenty Grand for the second time while winning the Arlington Classic in which he set a new Arlington Park track record of 2:02 2-5 for 1¼ miles on dirt.

Racing in 1932 and 1933, at age four and five, Mate won the 1933 Thanksgiving Day Handicap at Bowie Race Track, a race he had previously won as a three-year-old. and had second and third-place finishes in some of the major racing events including the Brooklyn and Metropolitan Handicaps.

=== England ===
In 1934, the then six-year-old mate was sent to England with the ultimate goal of winning the Ascot Gold Cup at Ascot Racecourse. Having been accustomed to race on flat, oval dirt tracks for most of his career he now had to adapt to European turf courses. He first ran in the Newbury Spring Cup in mid April without showing well, then finished third in the City and Suburban Handicap at Epsom Downs. He was second on the same racecourse in the Coronation Cup but out of the money behind Felicitation in June's Ascot Gold Cup. Mate won his first and only stakes in England on October 19, 1934, capturing the Challenge Stakes at Newmarket Racecourse.

== Stud record ==
Retired to stud duty, from a limited number of offspring, Mate most notably sired Elkridge, a U.S. Racing Hall of Fame inductee who was the American Champion Steeplechase Horse in 1942 and 1946.

== Breeding ==
Pedigree of Mate
Sire Prince Pal bay 1917	Prince Palatine bay 1908	Persimmon	St Simon*
Sire Prince Pal bay 1917	Prince Palatine bay 1908	Persimmon	Perdita II
Sire Prince Pal bay 1917	Prince Palatine bay 1908	Lady Lightfoot	Isinglass
Sire Prince Pal bay 1917	Prince Palatine bay 1908	Lady Lightfoot	Glare
Sire Prince Pal bay 1917	Wilful Maid ch. 1910	Sundridge	Amphion
Sire Prince Pal bay 1917	Wilful Maid ch. 1910	Sundridge	Sierra
Sire Prince Pal bay 1917	Wilful Maid ch. 1910	Marian Hood	Martagon
Sire Prince Pal bay 1917	Wilful Maid ch. 1910	Marian Hood	Maid Marion
Dam Killashandra bay 1922	Ambassador brown 1911	Dark Ronald	Bay Ronald
Dam Killashandra bay 1922	Ambassador brown 1911	Dark Ronald	Darkie
Dam Killashandra bay 1922	Ambassador brown 1911	Excellenza	Haut Brion*
Dam Killashandra bay 1922	Ambassador brown 1911	Excellenza	Gulbeyaz
Dam Killashandra bay 1922	The Banshee bay 1914	His Majesty	Melton
Dam Killashandra bay 1922	The Banshee bay 1914	His Majesty	Silver Sea
Dam Killashandra bay 1922	The Banshee bay 1914	Bannagroe	St Aidan*
Dam Killashandra bay 1922	The Banshee bay 1914	Bannagroe	Stella

* Mate is inbred 4S x 5D x 5D to the stallion St Simon, meaning that he appears fourth generation once on the sire side of his pedigree and fifth generation twice (via Haut Brion and St Aiden) on the dam side of his pedigree.
