= Pete Bostwick =

American tennis player, steeplechase jockey, horse trainer and polo player

Personal information
- Born: August 14, 1909 Bisby Lake, New York, U.S.
- Died: January 13, 1982 (aged 72) Palm Beach, Florida, U.S.
- Resting place: Aiken, South Carolina
- Occupation: Jockey / Trainer

Horse racing career
- Sport: Horse racing
- Career wins: Not found

Major racing wins
- Flat racing: Oakdale Handicap (1932) Steeplechase racing: Broad Hollow Handicap (1950, 1951); Brook National Handicap (1950, 1951, 1954, 1955); American Grand National (1951, 1957, 1958, 1962); Temple Gwathmey Handicap (1955, 1957)

Racing awards
- U.S. Champion Amateur Steeplechase Jockey (1928, 1929, 1930, 1931, 1932, 1941); U.S. Champion Steeplechase Trainer (1940, 1951, 1955)

Honors
- United States Racing Hall of Fame (1968); Aiken Thoroughbred Racing Hall of Fame (1977); Museum of Polo and Hall of Fame (1996); Nassau County Sports Hall of Fame (2006)

Significant horses
- Oedipus, Ancestor, Neji, Barnaby's Bluff
- Updated on January 2, 2008

George Herbert "Pete" Bostwick (August 14, 1909 – January 13, 1982) was an American court tennis player, a steeplechase jockey and horse trainer, and an eight-goal polo player.

== Biography ==
He was born in Bisby Lake, New York to Marie L. Stokes and Albert Carlton Bostwick. His grandfather, Jabez A. Bostwick, was a founder and treasurer of the Standard Oil Company of New York and a partner of John D. Rockefeller. His grandmother, Helen C. Bostwick, left upon her death in April 1920 a sum of $1,156,818 to him and similar amounts to his siblings. Among his cousins were the cross-dressing woman speedboat racer "Joe" a/k/a Betty Carstairs and the pilot Francis Francis.

Pete Bostwick's inherited wealth afforded him the opportunity to pursue a number of sporting interests. His father was a horseman and polo player and Pete Bostwick become one of a leading steeplechase owners, trainers, and riders. Pete Bostwick was a member of The Jockey Club and a patron of the National Tennis Club.

He rode Thoroughbred steeplechase horses from 1927 to 1949 both in the US and Grand National in the UK and also rode in flat racing. In flat racing he finished 4th in the 1928 running of the Belmont Stakes aboard Whisk Broom, owned by his uncle F. Ambrose Clark.

At Belmont Park in 1932 he became the second jockey (after Jockey W. C. ("Bill") Clancy in 1895) ever to ride a flat and steeplechase winner on the same day a feat which he repeated again within two weeks. Initially he rode to victory at Belmont Park aboard Thomas Hitchcock's Silverskin in a steeplechase and Latin Stables' Ha Ha in a flat race on the same day. Then repeated the feat two weeks later in the Metropolitan Driving Club, a 1-1/16-mi. flat race on J. F. Byers' Glaneur then won the Chamblet Memorial steeplechase on Mrs. Ambrose Clark's Madrigal II the same day.

As a trainer, in 1962 Bostwick became the first steeplechase trainer to have horses win more than $1 million in a single year. His horses were voted the Eclipse Award for Outstanding Steeplechase horse on six occasions: Oedipus (1950, 1951), Neji (1955, 1957, 1958), both of whom were voted into the United States Racing Hall of Fame, and Ancestor won the Eclipse Award in 1959.

Bostwick was a resident of Old Westbury, Long Island, Gilbertsville, New York and Aiken, South Carolina. First riding at the age of 7 his horseman roots were at the famed Aiken Preparatory School where his aunt, Mrs. Thomas Hitchcock known as the "mother of U. S. polo", taught him and many leading polo players of the era their skill. His talents attested to ultimately reaching an eight-goal rating. "Polo for the Public" was his motto at the Bostwick Field on Long Island, New York and polo for a purse was also inaugurated there. In his later years he maintained an immaculate polo field and stables [extant today] at his sprawling farm in Gilbertsville, New York under the name of Village Farms. Bostwick also owned Haig Point Plantation on Daufuskie Island off of Hilton Head in South Carolina which he bought from Stiles Harper of Estill, SC in 1961 for $143,000.

Pete skipped attending college remarking: "There is no use sitting in school when one can sit on a horse and go somewhere."

== Personal life and legacy ==
The New York Times reported Bostwick's wedding to Laura Elizabeth Curtis on 7 October 1933 and their divorce about 16 years later. An agreement gave Mrs. Bostwick custody of their three children, George H. Jr, James and Laura.

Pete married Dolly Van Stade on April 26, 1949 to at the home of her parents in Old Westbury, Long Island. Dolly was a granddaughter of Charles Steele, partner of J. Pierson Morgan. Her father was a noted polo player in the early days of the game on Long Island.

At the Aiken Thoroughbred Racing Hall of Fame and Museum, there is a permanent exhibit dedicated to his accomplishments. In 1968, Pete Bostwick was inducted into the United States' National Museum of Racing and Hall of Fame and posthumously inducted into the Museum of Polo and Hall of Fame in 1996. In 2006, he was inducted into the Nassau County Sports Hall of Fame.

Pete Bostwick died of a heart attack in 1982 while playing polo. He was survived by his wife, Dolly Von Stade Bostwick (1921–1998), four sons and three daughters.

His son, George Herbert "Pete" Bostwick Jr. (1934–2022), was one of the more versatile amateur sportsmen in American history. He won three National squash titles, two hard racquets Open Championships, and was a World Champion in court tennis.
