= List of public art in Newport, Rhode Island =

This is a list of public art in Newport, Rhode Island, in the United States. This list applies only to works of public art on permanent display in an outdoor public space. For example, this does not include artworks in museums. Public art may include sculptures, statues, monuments, memorials, murals, and mosaics.

Image	Title / subject	Location and coordinates	Date	Artist / designer	Type	Material	Dimensions	Designation	Owner / administrator	Wikidata	Notes
More images	Matthew Perry Monument	Touro Park 41.485719°N 71.309426°W	1869	John Quincy Adams Ward	Statue	Bronze				Q6791069	
More images	Oliver Perry Monument	Eisenhower Park 41.48997°N 71.31425°W	1885	William Greene Turner	Statue	Bronze				Q7087749	
More images	Rochambeau Monument	King Park 41.476885°N 71.321664°W	1934	Fernand Harmar	Statue	Bronze				Q7353773	
More images	Statue of Christopher Columbus	Intersection of Bellevue Avenue and Memorial Boulevard 41°29′01″N 71°18′29″W	1953		Statue	Bronze				Q96245382	
