= Alexander Stewart Webb =

Alexander Stewart Webb may refer to:

- Alexander S. Webb (1835–1911), army officer and Medal of Honor recipient
- Alexander Stewart Webb (banker) (1870–1948), American banker and philanthropist
