= List of public art in Newport =

List of public art in Newport may refer to:

- List of public art in Newport, Rhode Island
- List of public art in Newport, Wales
