= List of academicians educated at the United States Military Academy =

The United States Military Academy (USMA) is an undergraduate college in West Point, New York that educates and commissions officers for the United States Army. This list is drawn from alumni of the academy who became university educators or administrators, such as Dennis Hart Mahan (class of 1824), George Washington Custis Lee (class of 1854), Dwight D. Eisenhower (class of 1915), and Wesley Posvar (class of 1946).

== Academics ==
Note: "Class year" refers to the alumni's class year, which usually is the same year they graduated. However, in times of war, classes often graduate early.

Name	Class year	Notability	References
Horace Webster	1818	Lieutenant; mathematics professor at the Academy (1818–1825); professor of mathematics, professor of intellectual philosophy, and president at Geneva College (1828–1830, 1835–1836); president Free Academy of New York (1848–1869)	
Dennis Hart Mahan	1824	Lieutenant; military theorist, educator, author, and engineer; founding member of National Academy of Sciences; father of American naval historian and theorist Rear Admiral Alfred Thayer Mahan; of his other four children, son Frederick August Mahan graduated from the Academy in 1867	
Alexander Dallas Bache	1825	Lieutenant; founding president of the National Academy of Sciences; member of the Scientific Lazzaroni and the Royal Society; professor of natural philosophy and chemistry at the University of Pennsylvania (1828–1843)	
Leonidas Polk	1827	Second lieutenant USA, lieutenant general in Confederate States Army; resigned his commission soon after graduating from the academy to enter Virginia Theological Seminary; founder of University of the South; killed in combat during the Battle of Marietta; Fort Polk named in his honor	
Andrew A. Humphreys	1831	Major General; American Civil War; topographical and hydrological surveyor of the Mississippi River Delta; Chief of Engineers (1866–1875); an incorporator of the United States National Academy of Sciences	
William Augustus Norton	1831	Lieutenant; Black Hawk War; professor of natural philosophy and civil engineering (1831–1883); member of the United States National Academy of Sciences	
Benjamin Stoddert Ewell	1832	Colonel in Confederate States Army; professor of mathematics and natural philosophy at Hampden-Sydney College (1839–1846); president of The College of William & Mary (1854–1888); brother Richard S. Ewell, class of 1840, was a lieutenant general in Confederate States Army	
Francis Henney Smith	1833	Major General in Confederate States Army; first and longest-serving superintendent of Virginia Military Institute (1839–1889)	
Montgomery C. Meigs	1836	Major General; Quartermaster General during American Civil War; river and civil engineer; early member of National Academy of Sciences; General Montgomery Meigs, class of 1967, is his descendant	
William Gilham	1840	Colonel in Confederate States Army; Seminole War and Mexican–American War; professor at Virginia Military Institute; author of Manual of Instruction for the Volunteers and Militia of the United States, which was in use for over 145 years	
Bushrod Johnson	1840	Major General in Confederate States Army; Seminole War and Mexican–American War; served with distinction in many key battles such as the Battle of Chickamauga and Siege of Petersburg; professor of philosophy, chemistry, and engineering; co-chancellor of the University of Nashville (1870–1875)	
Josiah Gorgas	1841	Captain USA, brigadier general in Confederate States Army; Mexican–American War; chief of ordnance for the Confederacy; president of University of Alabama (1878-1883); son William C. Gorgas became Surgeon General of the United States Army	
Henry L. Eustis	1842	Brigadier General; American Civil War; founded the Lawrence Scientific School, later the Harvard School of Engineering and Applied Sciences	
Daniel Harvey Hill	1842	Lieutenant General in Confederate States Army; professor at Washington and Lee University and Davidson College; later the first president of the University of Arkansas (1877–1884)	
Edmund Kirby Smith	1845	Major USA, General CSA; Mexican–American War; Confederate commander of the Trans-Mississippi Department; president of University of Nashville (1870-1875); professor of mathematics at Sewanee: The University of the South in Sewanee, Tennessee (1875-1893)	
Stonewall Jackson	1846	Major in United States Army, lieutenant general in Confederate States Army; Mexican–American War; professor of natural and experimental philosophy and artillery at Virginia Military Institute (1851–1861); excelled in several battles during the American Civil War, including the First Battle of Bull Run where he received his nickname; accidentally shot by his own troops at the Battle of Chancellorsville and died of complications from pneumonia eight days later	
Oliver Otis Howard	1854	Major General; recipient of the Medal of Honor for his actions leading an attack at the Battle of Seven Pines despite wound which resulted in the loss of his right arm; led the campaign against Chief Joseph and the Nez Perce tribe; founder of Howard University; Superintendent of the Academy (1881–1882)	
George Washington Custis Lee	1854	First Lieutenant US Army, Major General CSA; graduated first in his class at the Academy; father Robert E. Lee, class of 1829, graduated second in his class; President, Washington and Lee University (1871–1897)	
Stephen D. Lee	1854	First Lieutenant USA, Lieutenant General CSA; Seminole Wars, American Indian Wars; youngest Lieutenant General in the Confederate States Army; first president of Agricultural and Mechanical College of Mississippi (1880-1899)	
Alexander S. Webb	1855	Major General; recipient of the Medal of Honor for his actions at the Battle of Gettysburg for personal bravery and leadership repulsing Pickett's Charge; president of the City College of New York (1869–1902)	
Winfield Scott Chaplin	1870	Chancellor of Washington University in St. Louis (1891-1907); Dean of the Lawrence Scientific School at Harvard University; Faculty member at Maine State College, Imperial University in Tokyo, and Union College	
John Wilson Ruckman	1883	Major General; a founder of the Journal of the United States Artillery; invented several artillery devices used during World War I; instructor at School of Submarine Defense	
Dwight D. Eisenhower	1915	General of the Army; trained tank crews in Pennsylvania during World War I; World War II; commander of European Theater of Operations and Supreme Headquarters Allied Expeditionary Force (1942–1945); 1st Military Governor of American Occupation Zone in Germany (1945); President of Columbia University (1948–1950, 1952–1953); 1st Supreme Allied Commander Europe (1951–1952); 34th President of the United States (1953–1961)	
Robert F. McDermott	1943	Brigadier General; World War II fighter pilot; executive of United Services Automobile Association (USAA); first Dean of Faculty at the United States Air Force Academy	
Wesley Posvar	1946	Brigadier General in the Air Force; first US Air Force officer to be granted a Rhodes Scholarship; 15th chancellor of the University of Pittsburgh (1967–1991), where Posvar Hall is named in his honor	
James R. Allen	1948	General in the Air Force; fighter pilot in Korean War and Vietnam War; superintendent of United States Air Force Academy (1974–1977)	
Charles R. Hamm	1956	Lieutenant General in the Air Force; fighter pilot in Vietnam War; member of the Air Force air demonstration squadron, the Thunderbirds (1964–1966); superintendent of United States Air Force Academy (1987–1991)	
Robert Ivany	1970	Major General; Vietnam War and Gulf War veteran; former president of the U.S. Army War College (2001–2004); president of University of Saint Thomas (2004–present)	
John Mearsheimer	1970	Served five years as an Air Force officer; political science professor at University of Chicago (1982–present), where he is the R. Wendell Harrison Distinguished Service Professor of Political Science and the co-director of the Program on International Security Policy; proponent of offensive realism	

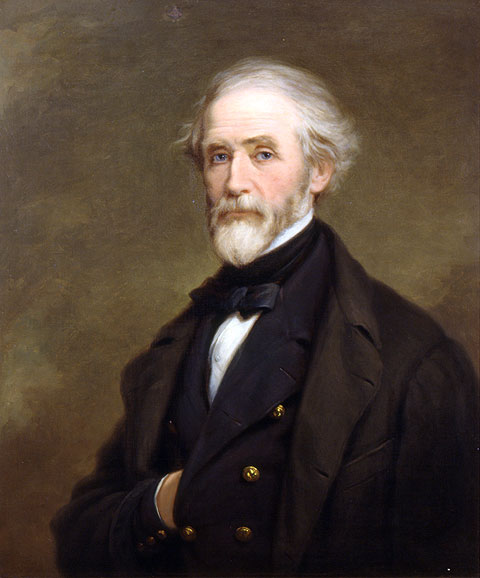
Dennis Hart Mahan

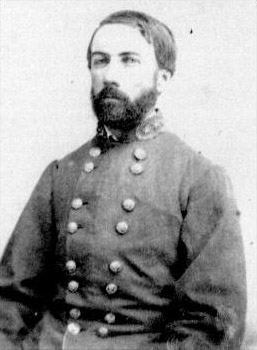
Daniel H. Hill

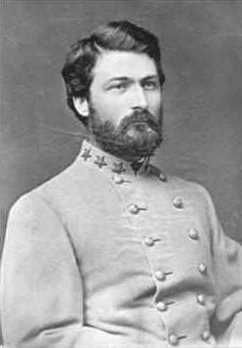
Custis Lee

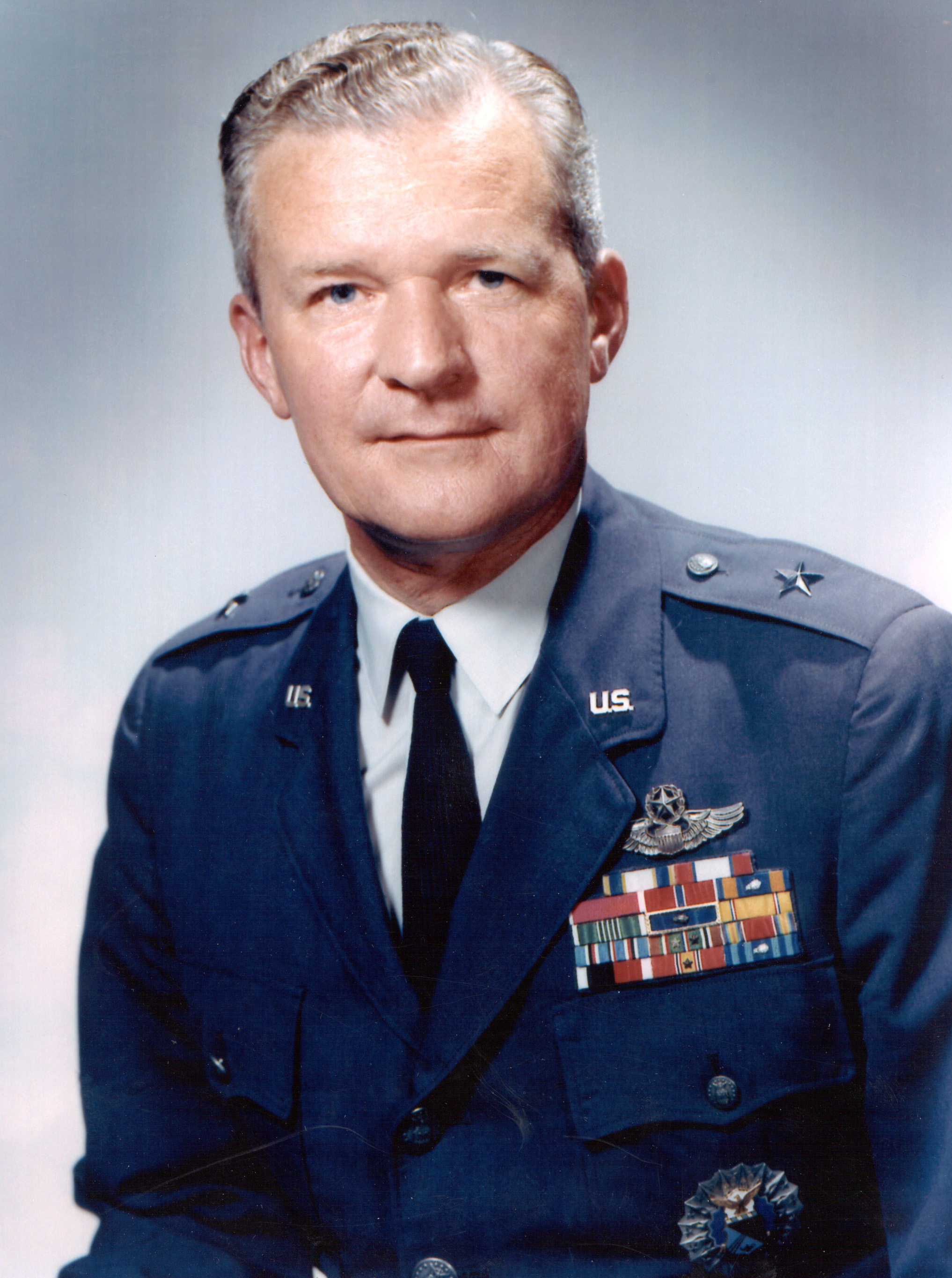
Robert McDermott

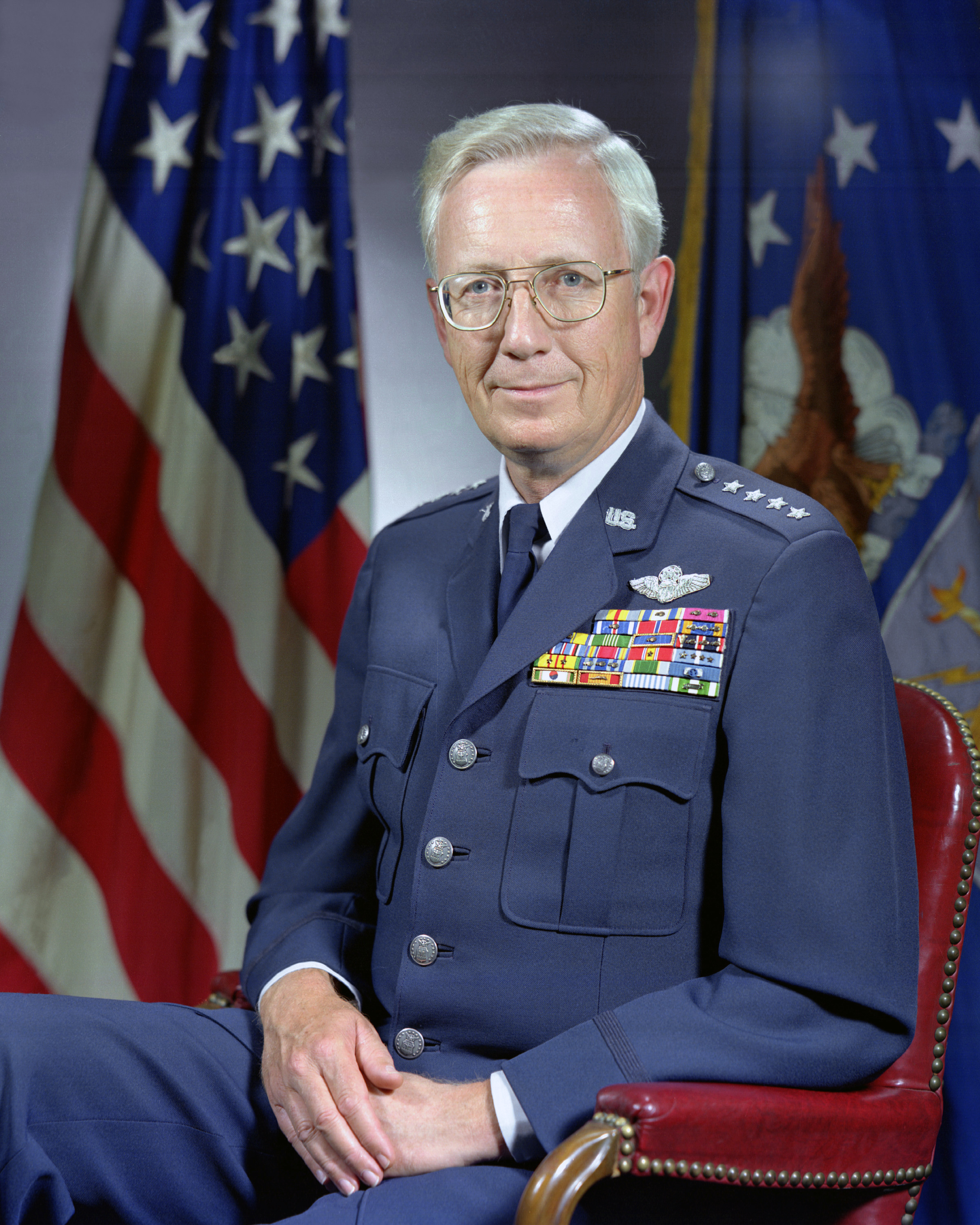
James Allen

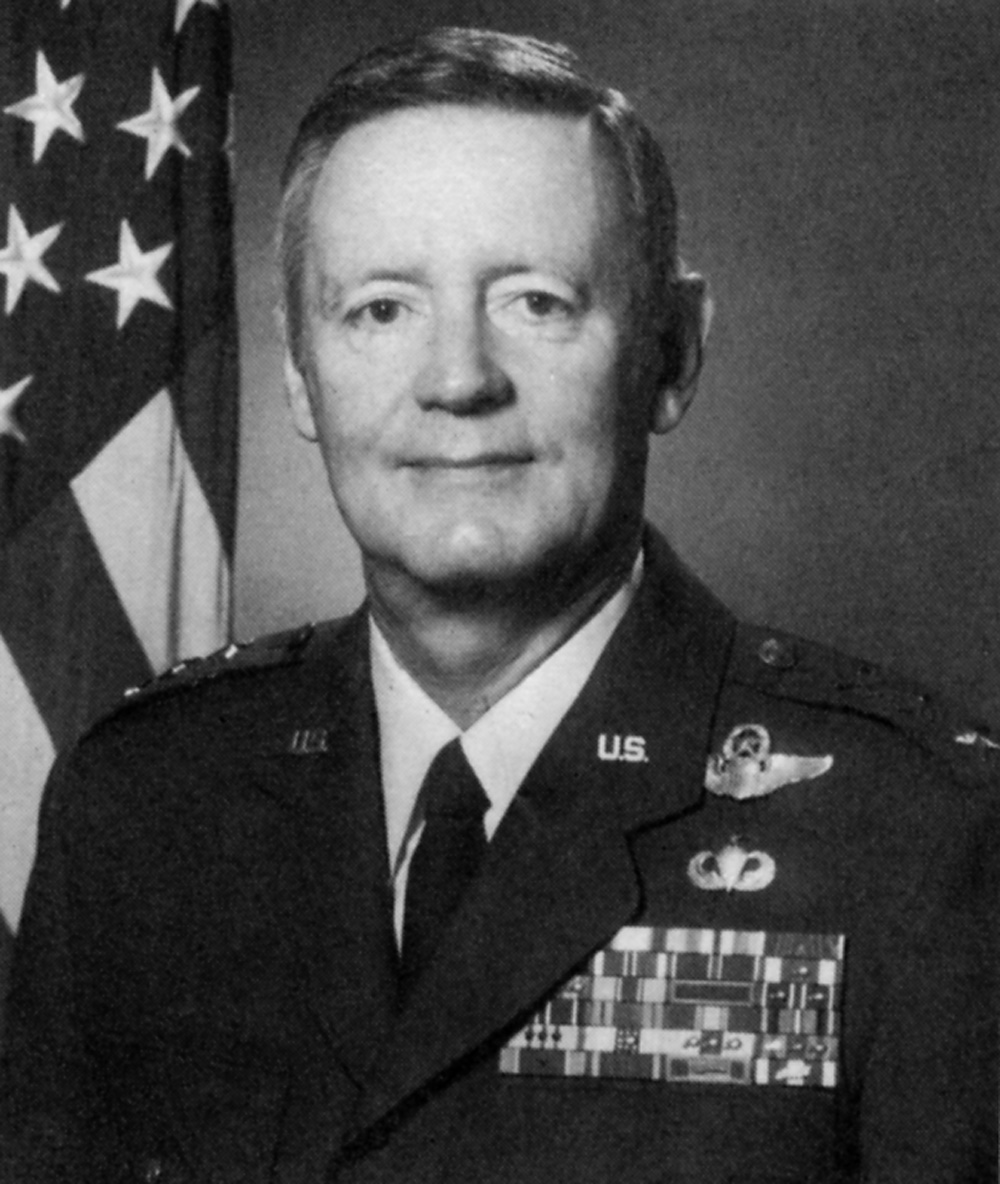
Charles Hamm
