= Henry E. Turner (Rhode Island physician) =

American physician and horticulturalist (1816–1897)

Dr. Henry Edward Turner (1816 - 1897) was a prominent physician and horticulturalist in Newport, Rhode Island in the late 19th century.

== Family ==
Turner was the son of James Varnum Turner and Catharine Turner (née Greene) and the brother of William Greene Turner (1833-1917) a noted sculptor who served an officer in the Union Army during the Civil War. Another brother, Charles W. Turner, served as commander of the Artillery Company of Newport from 1858 to 1860 and as a Captain in the 2nd Rhode Island Infantry in 1861.

He was the grandson of Dr. Peter Turner (1751-1822) who served as a surgeon in the 1st Rhode Island Regiment during the American Revolution. Peter Turner was an Original Member of the Rhode Island Society of the Cincinnati. Henry Turner was also a descendant of Roger Williams.

He was a cousin of Commodore Peter Turner (1803-1871), who served in the U.S. Navy in the early to middle 19th Century. He was probably also a relation of Captain Daniel Turner who distinguished himself at the Battle of Lake Erie.

== Career ==
Turner was a physician by profession and served as a civilian contract surgeon at Fort Adams in Newport during the American Civil War. Prior to the Civil War, he served as surgeon of the Artillery Company of Newport.

He became a hereditary member of the Rhode Island Society of the Cincinnati in 1877 and was a charter member of the Rhode Island Society of the Sons of the Revolution.

Turner was active in numerous organizations including the Newport School Committee, Newport Historical Society and the Artillery Company of Newport.

He was memorialized in the First Record Book of the Sons of the Revolution in the State of Rhode Island, 1896-1898.

He is buried in the Island Cemetery in Newport.
