= Society of the Cincinnati =

American lineage society

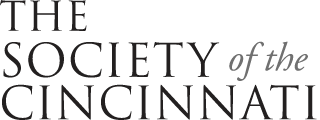

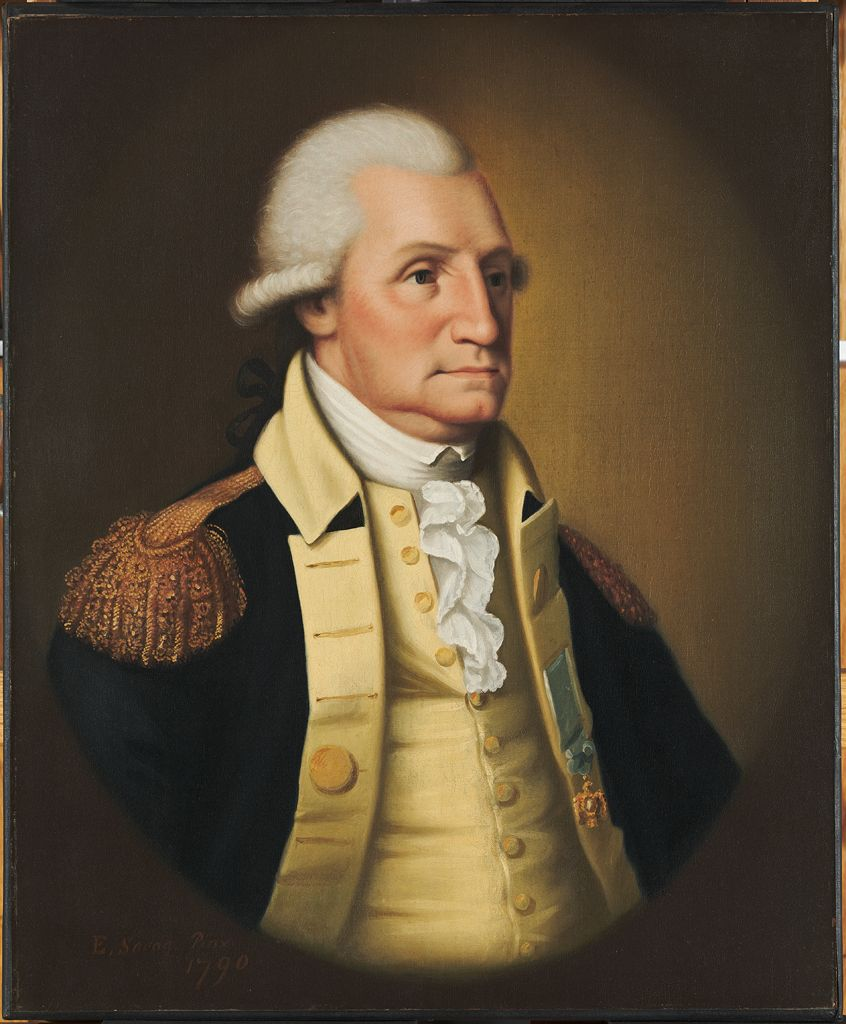
- General George Washington, first President General of the Society of the Cincinnati
- Named after: Lucius Quinctius Cincinnatus
- Established: May 13, 1783 (243 years ago)
- Founder: Henry Knox
- Founded at: Fishkill, New York, US
- Type: Lineage society
- Headquarters: Anderson House, Washington, D.C., US
- Coordinates: 38.9107011°N 77.0477045°W
- Region served: United States and France
- Official language: English
- President General: Joel Thomas Daves IV
- Vice President General: Francis Ellerbe Grimball
- Secretary General: Mark Calhoun Williams
- Treasurer General: William Postell Raiford, Ph.D.
- Key people: Executive Director; F. Anderson Morse
- Main organ: Triennial Meeting
- Website: The Society of the Cincinnati; The American Revolution Institute

The Society of the Cincinnati is a fraternal, hereditary society founded in 1783 to commemorate the American Revolutionary War that saw the creation of the United States. Membership is largely restricted to descendants of military officers who served in the Continental Army.

The Society has thirteen constituent societies in the United States and one in France. It was founded to perpetuate "the remembrance of this vast event" (the achievement of American Independence), "to preserve inviolate those exalted rights and liberties of human nature," and "to render permanent the cordial affection subsisting among the officers" of the Continental Army who served in the Revolutionary War.

Now in its third century, the Society promotes public interest in the Revolution through its library and museum collections, publications, and other activities. It is the oldest patriotic, hereditary society in the United States.

== History ==
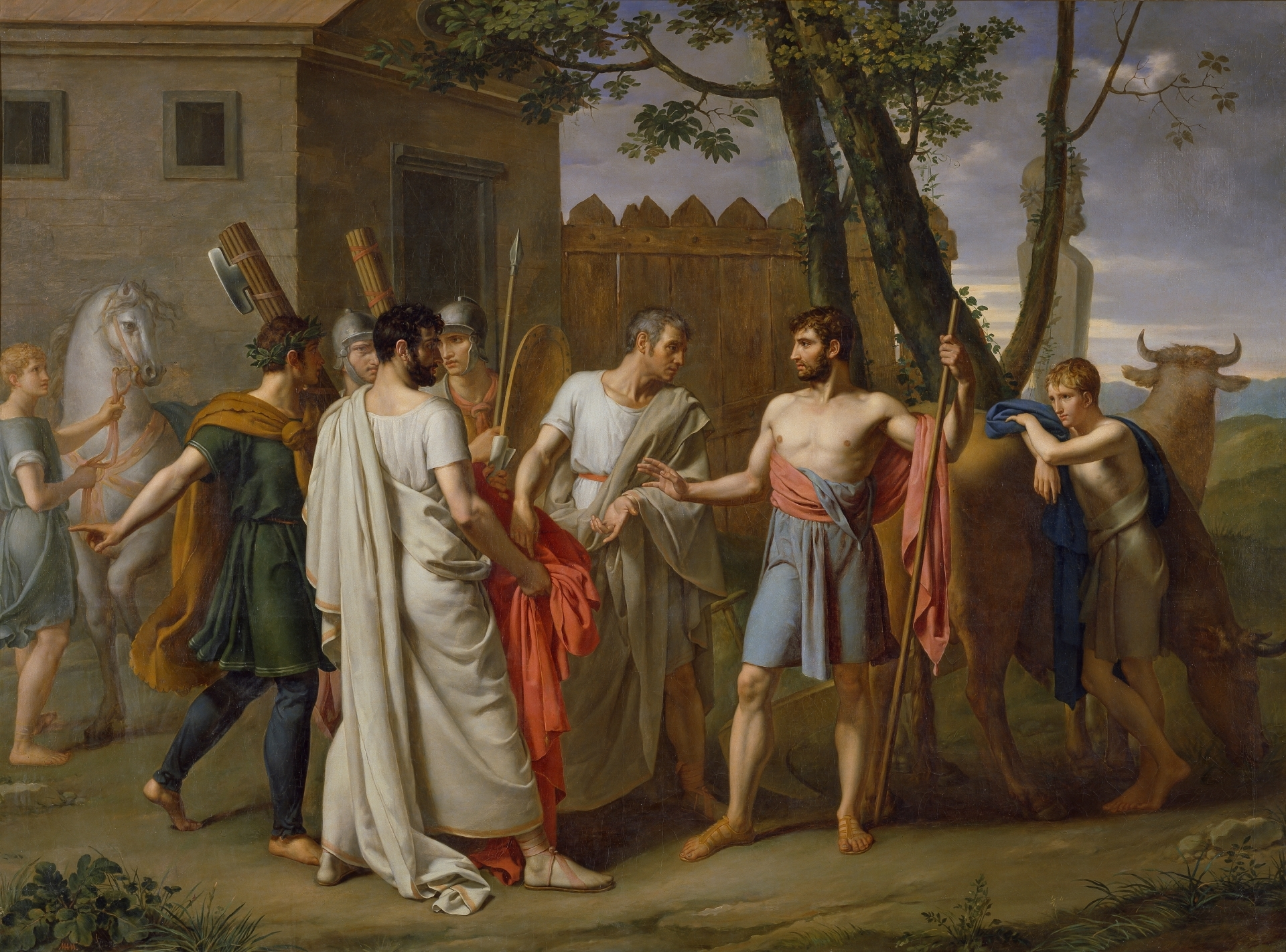
Cincinnatus Abandons the Plow to Dictate Laws to Rome, by Juan Antonio Ribera (Museo del Prado).

The Society is named after Lucius Quinctius Cincinnatus (c. 519 – c. 430 BC), who left his farm to accept a term as Roman Consul and served as Dictator. He was given lawful dictatorial control of Rome to meet a war emergency. When the battle was won, he relinquished his powers and went back to plowing his fields. The Society's motto reflects that ethic of selfless service: Omnia reliquit servare rempublicam ("He relinquished everything to serve the Republic"). The Society has had three goals: "To preserve the rights so dearly won; to promote the continuing union of the states; and to assist members in need, their widows, and their orphans."

The concept of the Society of the Cincinnati was that of Major General Henry Knox. The first meeting of the Society was held in May 1783 at a dinner at the Verplanck House (present-day Mount Gulian), Fishkill, New York, before the British evacuation from New York City. The meeting was presided over by Major General Friedrich Wilhelm von Steuben, with Lieutenant Colonel Alexander Hamilton serving as the orator. The participants agreed to stay in contact with each other after the war. Mount Gulian, von Steuben's headquarters, is considered the birthplace of the Society of the Cincinnati, where the Institution was formally adopted on May 13, 1783.

Membership was generally limited to officers who had served at least three years in the Continental Army or Navy, or had served until the end of the War; it included officers of the French Army and Navy above certain ranks. Officers in the Continental Line who died during the War were also entitled to be recorded as members, and membership would devolve to their eldest male heir. Members of the considerably larger fighting forces comprising the Colonial Militias and Minutemen were not entitled to join the Society. Within 12 months of the founding, a constituent Society had been organized in each of the 13 states and in France. Of about 5,500 men originally eligible for membership, 2,150 had joined within a year. King Louis XVI ordained the French Society of the Cincinnati, which was organized on July 4, 1784 (Independence Day). Up to that time, the King of France had not allowed his officers to wear any foreign decorations, but he made an exception in favor of the badge of the Cincinnati.

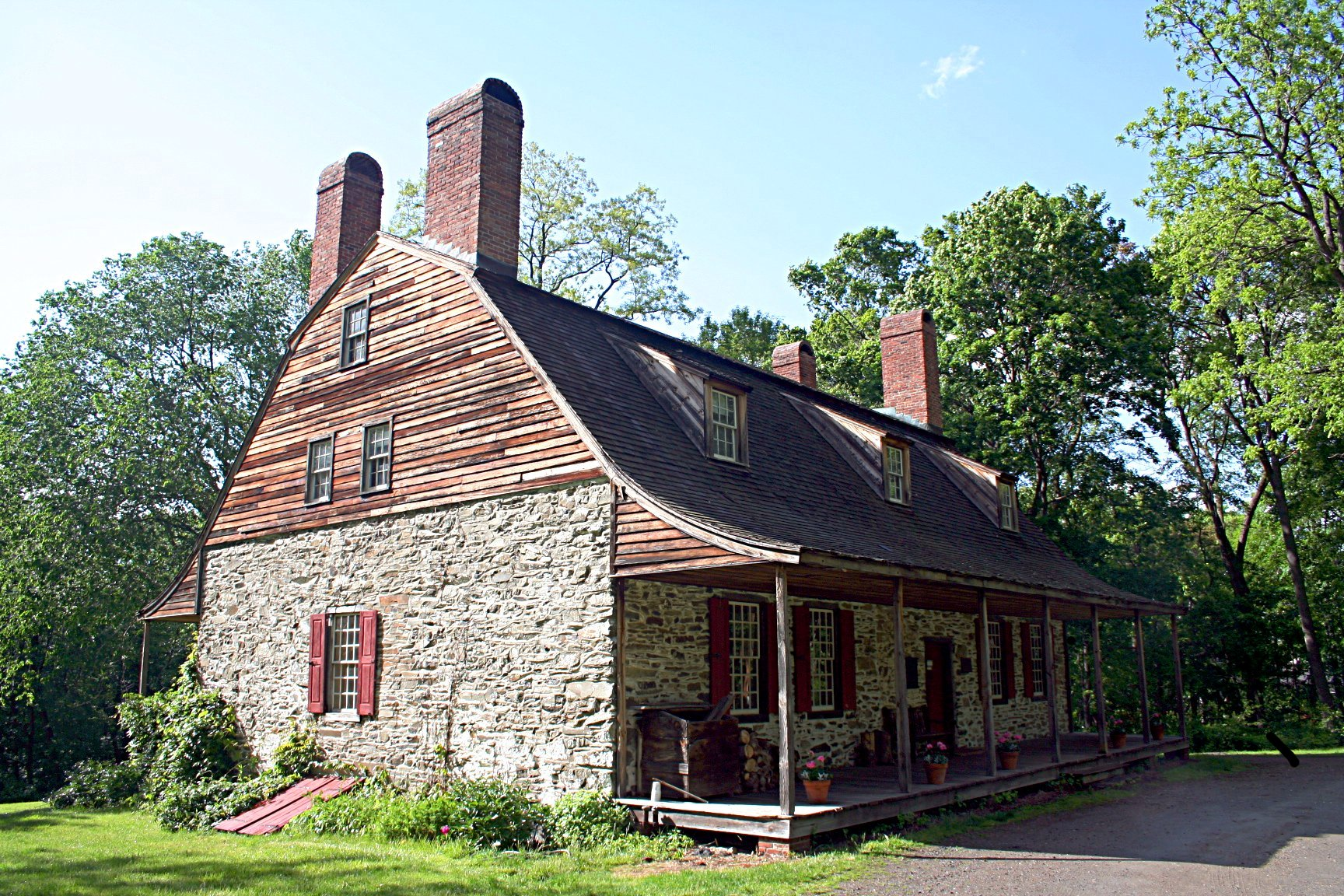
The Verplanck House (present-day Mount Gulian), Fishkill, New York, Steuben's headquarters, where the Society was instituted May 13, 1783.

The Society's rules adopted a system of primogeniture, wherein membership was passed down to the eldest son after the death of the original member. Present-day hereditary members generally must be descended from an original member, an officer who died in service, or an officer who qualified for membership at the Society's founding but did not join. Each officer may be represented by only one descendant at any given time, following the rules of primogeniture. (The rules of eligibility and admission are controlled by each of the 14 Constituent Societies to which members are admitted. They differ slightly in each society, and some allow more than one descendant of an eligible officer.) The requirement for primogeniture made the society controversial in its early years, as the new states quickly did away with laws supporting primogeniture as remnants of the English feudal system.

George Washington was elected the first President General of the Society, serving from December 1783 until he died in 1799. The second President General was Alexander Hamilton, and after he died from wounds suffered in a duel in 1804, he was succeeded by Charles Cotesworth Pinckney.

The society's members have included notable military and political leaders, including 23 of the 39 signers of the United States Constitution.

== Insignia ==
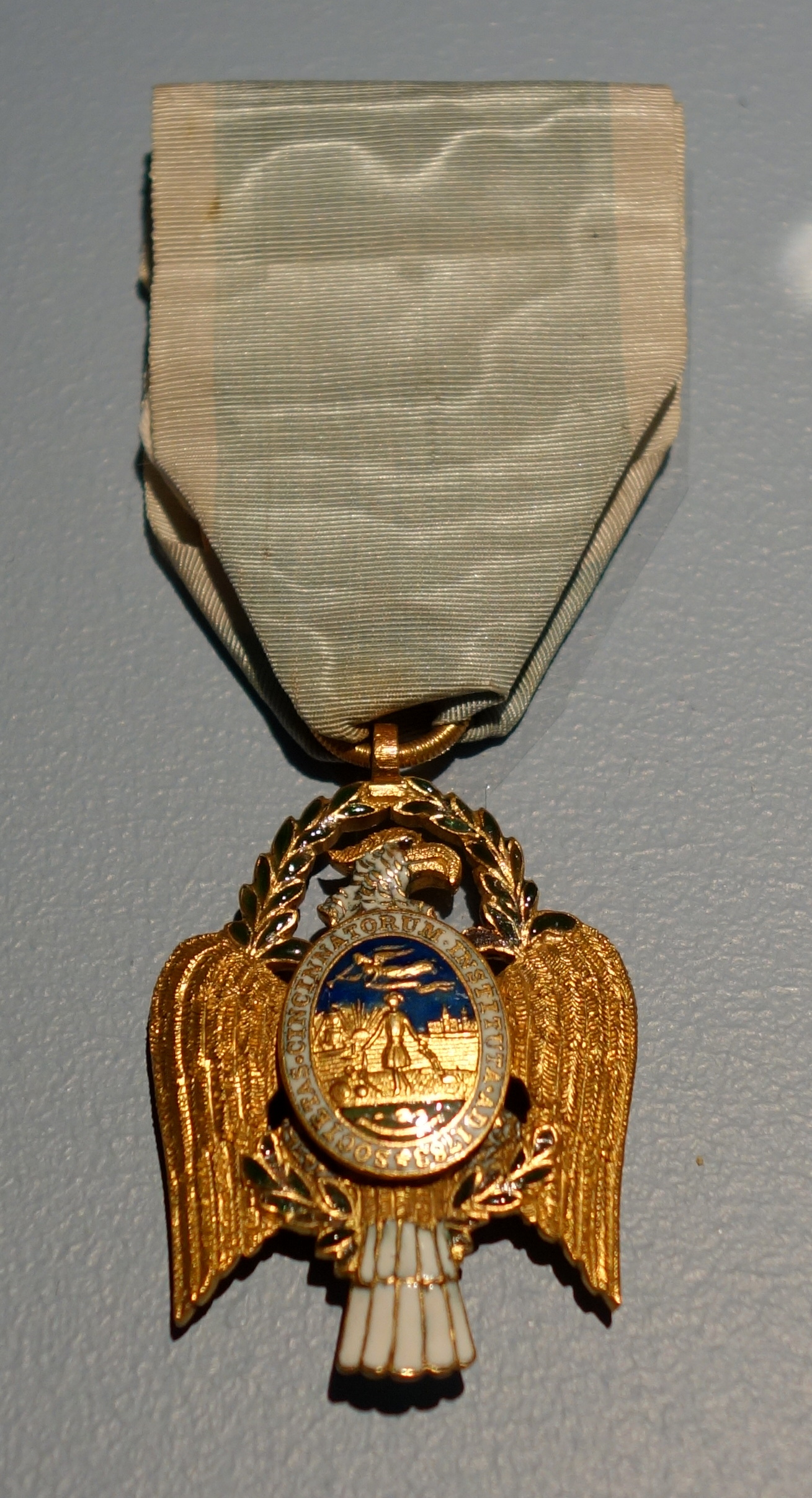
Insignia of the Society, c. 1783.

On June 19, 1783, the General Society of the Cincinnati adopted the bald eagle, one of America's first post-revolution symbols and an important piece of American iconography, as its insignia. (The insignia was initially called an "order" in the Society's records.) It is the second official American emblem to use the bald eagle, following the Great Seal of the United States. The insignia may have been derived from the same discourse that produced the seal.

The suggestion of the bald eagle as the Cincinnati insignia was made by Major Pierre L'Enfant, a French officer who joined the American Army in 1777, served in the Corps of Engineers, and became one of the first members of the Society. He observed that "[t]he Bald Eagle, which is unique to this continent, and is distinguished from those of other climates by its white head and tail, appears to me to deserve attention." In 1783, L'Enfant was commissioned to travel to France to have the first eagle badges made, based on his design).

The medallions at the center of the Cincinnati Eagle depict, on the obverse, Cincinnatus receiving his sword from Roman senators and, on the reverse, Cincinnatus at his plow being crowned by the figure of Pheme (a personification of fame). The Society's light blue and white colors symbolize the fraternal bond between the United States and France. While all Cincinnati Eagles conform to this general design, no single specific design is official. Over 50 variations of the eagle have been produced over the years.

A unique diamond-encrusted "eagle", referred to as the "Diamond Eagle", was given to George Washington by Admiral Comte d'Estaing on behalf of the officers of the French Navy. Washington received it on May 11, 1784, at the meeting of the General Society in Philadelphia. Upon Washington's death in 1799, it was given by his heirs to Alexander Hamilton, who succeeded Washington as President of the Society. Upon Hamilton's death, it was given to Charles Cotesworth Pinckney, who succeeded Hamilton as the Society's president. It has since served as the official insignia of the Society's president and is transferred when a new president takes office. In the late 20th century, a copy of the Diamond Eagle was made and worn by the president on occasions other than the Triennial Meeting.

A specially commissioned "eagle" worn by President General George Washington was presented to Marquis de Lafayette in 1824 during his grand tour of the United States. This badge remained in possession of the Lafayette family until sold at auction on December 11, 2007, for 5.3 million USD by Lafayette's great-great-granddaughter. Together with what is believed to be the original ribbon and red leather box, the badge was purchased by the Josée and René de Chambrun Foundation for display in Lafayette's bedroom at Chateau La Grange, his former home, thirty miles east of Paris; it may also be displayed at Mount Vernon, Washington's former home in Virginia. This was one of three eagles known to have been owned by Washington, who most often wore the "diamond eagle", a diamond-encrusted badge given him by the French matelots (sailors). That diamond eagle continues to be passed down to each President General of the Society of the Cincinnati as part of his induction into office.

The Cincinnati Eagle is displayed in various places of public importance, including Sawyer Point in Cincinnati (named for the Society), Ohio. A popular public square was built here to house a 15' bronze statue of Cincinnatus flanked by four masts flying the American, state, city, and Society flags. The flag of the Society displays blue and white stripes and a dark blue canton (containing a circle of 14 stars around the Cincinnati Eagle, representing the fourteen subsidiary societies) in the upper corner next to the hoist. Refer to the section below for the city's historical connection to the Society.

By Federal law, Society members may wear their eagles on their American military uniforms on ceremonial occasions. In practice, however, this has been rarely done since the early 20th century.

== Criticism ==
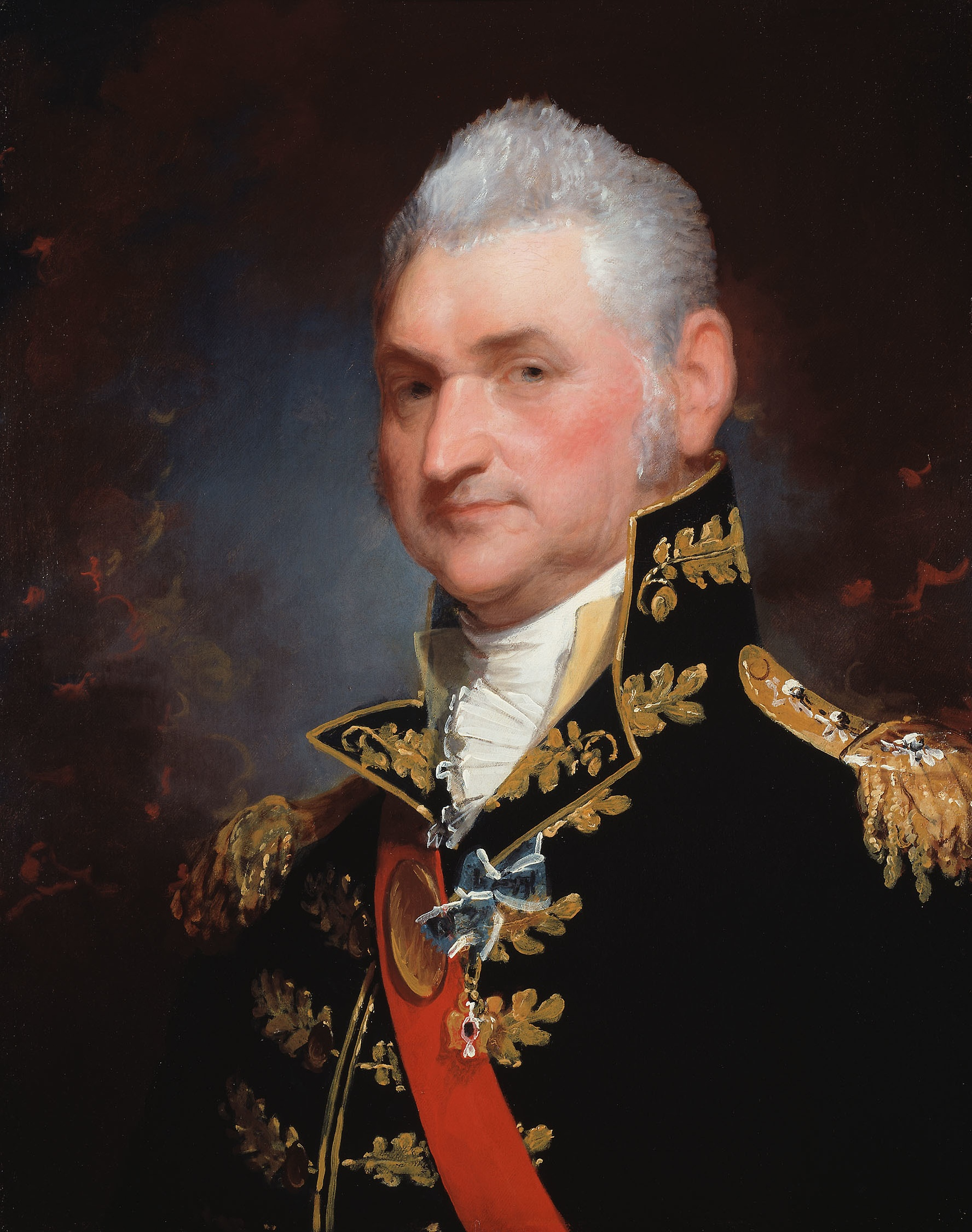
Portrait of Henry Dearborn by Gilbert Stuart, 1812. Dearborn is depicted wearing the Insignia of the Society.

When news of the foundation of the society spread, judge Aedanus Burke published several pamphlets under the pseudonym Cassius where he criticized the society as an attempt at reestablishing a hereditary nobility in the new republic. The pamphlets, entitled An Address to the Freemen of South Carolina (January 1783) and Considerations on the Society or Order of Cincinnati (October 1783), sparked a general outcry that included prominent names, including Thomas Jefferson and John Adams. The criticism voiced concern about the apparent creation of a hereditary elite; membership eligibility is inherited through primogeniture and generally excluded enlisted men and militia officers unless they were placed under "State Line" or "Continental Line" forces for a substantial period, and their descendants.

Benjamin Franklin was among the Society's earliest critics. He was concerned about the creation of a quasi-noble order and of the Society's use of the eagle in its emblem, as evoking the traditions of heraldry and the English aristocracy. In a letter to his daughter Sarah Bache written on January 26, 1784, Franklin commented on the ramifications of the Cincinnati:

I only wonder that, when the united Wisdom of our Nation had, in the Articles of Confederation, manifested their Dislike of establishing Ranks of Nobility, by Authority either of the Congress or of any particular State, a Number of private persons should think proper to distinguish themselves and their Posterity, from their fellow Citizens, and form an Order of hereditary Knights, in direct Opposition to the solemnly declared Sense of their Country.

The influence of the Cincinnati members, former officers, was another concern. When delegates to the Constitutional Convention were debating the method of choosing a president, James Madison reported the following speech of Elbridge Gerry of Massachusetts:

A popular election in this case is radically vicious. The ignorance of the people would put it in the power of some one set of men dispersed through the Union & acting in Concert to delude them into any appointment. He observed that such a Society of men existed in the Order of the Cincinnati. They are respectable, United, and influential. They will in fact elect the chief Magistrate in every instance, if the election be referred to the people. [Gerry's] respect for the characters composing this Society could not blind him to the danger & impropriety of throwing such a power into their hands.

The debate spread to France because of the eligibility of French veterans from the Revolutionary War. In 1785 Honoré Gabriel Riqueti, comte de Mirabeau was approached by Franklin, who was at the time stationed in Paris, and suggested to him to write something about the society directed at the French public. Mirabeau was provided with Burke's pamphlets and Franklin's letter to his daughter, and from this, with the help of Nicolas Chamfort, created an enlarged version entitled Considérations sur l'Ordre de Cincinnatus which was published in London in November that year. An English translation by Samuel Romilly followed, of which an American edition was published in 1786.

Following this public debate and criticism, George Washington, who had been unaware of the particulars of the charter when he agreed to become president of the society, began to doubt the benefit of the society. At its first general meeting on May 4, 1784, he had considered abolishing the society. However, in the meantime, Major L'Enfant had arrived, bringing his designs of the diplomas and medals, as well as news of the success of the society in France, which made abolition of the society impossible. Washington instead delivered at the meeting an ultimatum that if the clauses about heredity were not abandoned, he would resign from his post as president of the society. This was accepted, and an informal agreement was made not to wear the eagles in public so as not to resemble European chivalrous orders. A new charter, the so-called Institution, was printed, which omitted, among others, the disputed clauses about heredity. This was sent to the local chapters for approval, which was approved in all of them except for the chapters in New York, New Hampshire, and Delaware. However, when the public furor about the society had died down, the new Institution was rescinded, and the original was reintroduced, including the clauses about heredity. The French chapter, which had obtained official permission to form from the king Louis XVI, also abolished heredity but never reintroduced it. Thus the last members were approved on February 3, 1792, shortly before the French monarchy was disbanded.

== Later activities ==
=== City development by early members ===
The members of Cincinnati were among those developing many of America's first and most prominent cities to the west of the Appalachians, most notably Cincinnati, Ohio, and Pittsburgh, Pennsylvania.

The first governor of the Northwest Territory, Arthur St. Clair, was a member of the Society. He renamed a small settlement "Cincinnati" to honor the Society and to encourage settlement by Society members. Among them was Captain Jacob Piatt, who settled across the river from Cincinnati in northern Kentucky on land granted to him for service during the War. Captain David Ziegler was the first Mayor of Cincinnati.

Lt. Ebenezer Denny (1761–1822), an original Pennsylvanian Cincinnatus, was elected the first mayor of the incorporated city of Pittsburgh in 1816. Pittsburgh developed from Fort Pitt, which had been commanded from 1777 to 1783 by four men who were founding members of the Society.

Richard Varick was a Mayor of New York City.

=== Public awareness ===
Today's Society supports efforts to increase public awareness and memory of the ideals and actions of the men who created the American Revolution and an understanding of American history, emphasizing the period from the outset of the Revolution to the War of 1812. At its headquarters at Anderson House in Washington, DC, the Society holds manuscript, portrait, and model collections about events of and military science during this period. Members of the Society have contributed to endow professorships, lecture series, awards, and educational materials concerning the United States representative democracy.

=== Membership rules ===
Over the years, membership rules have continued as they were first established. The definition and acceptance of membership have remained with the constituent societies rather than the General Society in Washington. An eligible officer of the Continental Army during the Revolutionary War can be represented in the Society of the Cincinnati by only one male descendant at a time, successor members excepted. Collateral male heirs are accepted in some constituent societies if the direct male line dies out. Timothy Page, writing for The Washington Post in 2001, noted that the Society of the Cincinnati remains dedicated to the rules for membership established in 1783, with the Society of the Cincinnati not having yet been able to "identify descendants of a black officer who might qualify for membership".

Each of the fourteen constituent societies admits honorary male members, but these men cannot designate an heir (a successor member). The only U.S. President who was a true hereditary member was Franklin Pierce. Andrew Jackson and Zachary Taylor were honorary members before becoming president. Other presidents became honorary members while in office and after leaving office.

=== Prize ===
The Society of the Cincinnati Prize recognizes the author of an outstanding work that advances understanding of the American Revolution and its legacy. Established in 1989 as a triennial award, the prize is now presented annually.

Since 1989, the authors awarded this prize are:

- 1989: Bernard Bailyn, Voyagers to the West: A Passage in the Peopling of America on the Eve of the Revolution
- 1992: P. D. G. Thomas, Tea Party to Independence: The Third Phase of the American Revolution
- 1995: Stanley M. Elkins and Eric L. McKitrick, The Age of Federalism
- 1998: Jack N. Rakove, Original Meanings: Politics and Ideas in the Making of the Constitution
- 2001: Saul Cornell, The Other Founders: Anti-Federalism and the Dissenting Tradition in America
- 2004: Elizabeth Fenn, Pox Americana: The Great Smallpox Epidemic of 1775–1782
- 2007: Alan Taylor, The Divided Ground: Indians, Settlers, and the Northern Borderland of the American Revolution
- 2010: Matthew H. Spring, With Zeal and With Bayonets Only: The British Army on Campaign in North America, 1775–1783
- 2013: Benjamin L. Carp, Defiance of the Patriots: The Boston Tea Party and the Making of America
- 2018: Eric Hinderaker, Boston's Massacre
- 2020: John Buchanan, The Road to Charleston: Nathanael Greene and the American Revolution
- 2021: T. Cole Jones, Captives of Liberty: Prisoners of War and the Politics of Vengeance in the American Revolution
- 2022: Kevin J. Weddle, The Compleat Victory: Saratoga and the American Revolution
- 2023: Friederike Baer, Hessians: German Soldiers in the American Revolutionary War
- 2024: Eli Merritt, Disunion Among Ourselves: A Political History of the American Revolution
- 2025: Vaughn Scribner, Under Alien Skies: Environment, Suffering, and the Defeat of the British Military in Revolutionary America
- 2026: Michael C. Harris, Fighting for Philadelphia: Forts Mercer and Mifflin, the Battle of Whitemarsh, and the Road to Valley Forge, October 5–December 19, 1777

== Headquarters ==
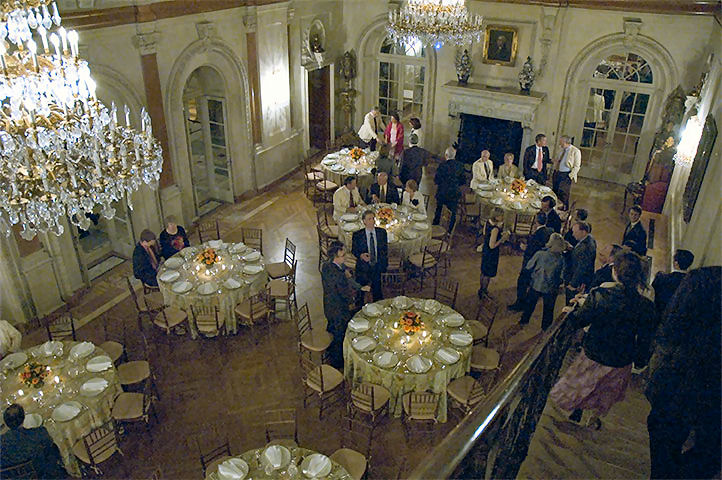
The General Society in Washington, D.C. makes Anderson House and its ballroom available for private events.

The General Society is headquartered at Anderson House, also known as the Larz Anderson House, at 2118 Massachusetts Avenue, NW in the Dupont Circle neighborhood of Washington, D.C. The Anderson House also serves as a Society museum and research library. It is located on Embassy Row, near various international embassies.

Anderson House was built between 1902 and 1905 as the winter residence of Larz Anderson, an American diplomat, and his wife, Isabel Weld Perkins, an author and American Red Cross volunteer. The architects Arthur Little and Herbert Browne of Boston designed Anderson House in the Beaux-Arts style. Anderson House was listed on the National Register of Historic Places in 1971 and was further designated a National Historic Landmark in 1996.

The General Society's museum collections include portraits, armaments, and personal artifacts of Revolutionary War soldiers; commemorative objects; objects associated with the history of the Society and its members, including Cincinnati china and insignia; portraits and personal artifacts of members of the Anderson family; and artifacts related to the history of the house, including the U.S. Navy's occupation of it during World War II.

=== Library ===
The library of the General Society of the Cincinnati collects, preserves, and makes available for research printed and manuscript materials relating to the military and naval history of the eighteenth century and early nineteenth century, with a particular concentration on the people and events of the American Revolution and the War of 1812. The collection includes various modern and rare materials, including official military documents, contemporary accounts and discourses, manuscripts, maps, graphic arts, literature, and many naval art and science works. In addition, the library is the home to the archives of the Society of the Cincinnati as well as a collection of material relating to Larz and Isabel Anderson. The library is open to researchers by appointment.

=== American Revolution Institute ===
The Society of the Cincinnati created the American Revolution Institute (ARI) in 2012 to renew appreciation of the history and ideals of the United States' revolutionary generation. ARI is an advocacy organization that promotes understanding and appreciation of the American Revolution and its legacy.

== Affiliations ==
- American Independence Museum: The Society of the Cincinnati in the State of New Hampshire owns and operates through a board of governors the American Independence Museum in Exeter, New Hampshire. The American Independence Museum is a private, not-for-profit institution whose mission is to provide a place for the study, research, education, and interpretation of the American Revolution and of the role that New Hampshire, Exeter, and the Gilman family played in the founding of the new republic. Museum collections include two rare drafts of the U.S. Constitution, an original Dunlap Broadside of the United States Declaration of Independence, as well as an original Badge of Military Merit, awarded by George Washington to soldiers demonstrating extraordinary bravery. Exhibits highlight the Society of the Cincinnati, the nation's oldest veterans' society, and its first president, George Washington. Permanent collections include American furnishings, ceramics, silver, textiles, and military ephemera.
- American Philosophical Society: many Cincinnati were among its first board members and contributors; the modern societies maintain informal, collegial relationships only

== Notable original members ==
A list of notables from among the original members of the Society of the Cincinnati:

- General George Washington – President of the United States and President General of the Society.
- Lieutenant Colonel James Monroe, President of the United States
- Brigadier General, Governor and Vice President George Clinton
- Lieutenant Colonel, Senator, and Vice President Aaron Burr
- Major General Alexander Hamilton (President General)
- Louis XVI – King of France
- Lieutenant General the Comte de Rochambeau
- Chaplain and United States Senator Abraham Baldwin
- Chaplain and Minister to France Joel Barlow
- Captain Joshua Barney, United States Navy (USN)
- Commodore John Barry, USN
- Colonel William Barton
- Captain and U.S. Representative Thomas Boude
- Colonel and Delegate to the U.S. Constitutional Convention David Brearly
- Surgeon's Mate Isaac Bronson
- Lieutenant and U.S. Representative David Brooks
- Major General and Governor John Brooks
- Brigadier General Henry Burbeck
- Captain David Bushnell – builder of the submarine Turtle
- Major General Richard Butler
- Colonel Zebulon Butler
- Lieutenant Colonel and Congressman Edward Carrington
- Brevet Major General James Clinton
- Surgeon James Craik - Physician General (precursor of the Surgeon General) of the United States Army
- Captain Richard Dale, USN
- Captain Luke Day
- Major General and Secretary of War Henry Dearborn
- Captain Ebenezer Denny
- Lieutenant Colonel John Doughty
- Surgeon and Secretary of War William Eustis
- Colonel Christian Febiger
- Major Nicholas Fish
- Brigadier General Peter Gansevoort
- Brigade Chaplain John Gano
- Major General Horatio Gates
- Captain Nicholas Gilman
- Colonel William Grayson
- Major General Nathanael Greene
- Lieutenant Abijah Hammond
- Brevet Brigadier General Josiah Harmar
- Major General William Heath
- Major General Robert Howe
- Major Joseph Howell Jr.
- Brigadier General Isaac Huger
- Brigadier General William Hull
- Major David Humphreys
- Colonel Thomas Hunt
- Major General Henry Jackson
- Brevet Brigadier General Michael Jackson
- Major William Jackson
- Captain John Paul Jones, USN
- Captain William Jones, USMC
- Major General Henry Knox (Secretary General)
- Brigadier General Tadeusz Kościuszko
- Major General the Marquis de La Fayette
- Major General Henry Lee III ("Light Horse Harry")
- Major Pierre L'Enfant
- Major General and Governor Morgan Lewis (President General)
- Major General Benjamin Lincoln
- Captain James Lingan
- Supreme Court Justice Henry Brockholst Livingston
- Brevet Brigadier General and Governor George Mathews
- Major and US Marshal Allen McLane
- Surgeon Charles McKnight
- Brigadier General Lachlan McIntosh
- Major, Secretary of State of Georgia John Milton
- Brigadier General Daniel Morgan
- Captain Alexander Murray, USN
- Major Samuel Nicholas, USMC
- Captain John Nicholson, USN
- Captain Samuel Nicholson, USN
- Brigadier General and Senator William North
- Lieutenant Colonel Jeremiah Olney
- Major, Governor and Senator Aaron Ogden (President General)
- Brigadier General Andrew Pickens
- Major General Charles C. Pinckney (President General)
- Major General Thomas Pinckney (President General)
- Brigadier General and Governor Benjamin Pierce
- Major General, Senator and Governor Thomas Posey
- Brigadier General Rufus Putnam
- Lieutenant Colonel Nathaniel Ramsey
- Major General Arthur St. Clair
- Brevet Major Winthrop Sargent
- Major General and Senator Philip Schuyler
- Major General and Governor Charles Scott
- Major General and Congressman William Shepard
- Colonel Henry Sherburne
- Major General William Smallwood
- Lieutenant Colonel William Stephens Smith
- Lieutenant Colonel William Stacy
- Major General John Sullivan
- Paymaster General Caleb Swan
- Colonel Heman Swift
- Captain Silas Talbot, USN
- Brevet Lieutenant Colonel and Congressman Benjamin Tallmadge
- Captain and Congressman Adamson Tannehill
- Lieutenant Colonel Richard Taylor
- Lieutenant Colonel Tench Tilghman
- Lieutenant Colonel and Governor Jonathan Trumbull Jr.
- Brigadier General and Congressman Philip Van Cortlandt
- Brigadier General James Mitchell Varnum
- Colonel Axel von Fersen the Younger (French Army)
- Lieutenant Colonel Curt von Stedingk (French Army)
- Major General Baron Von Steuben
- Colonel and Mayor Richard Varick
- Major General Anthony Wayne
- Captain Abraham Whipple, USN
- Major General James Wilkinson
- Colonel and Mayor of New York City Marinus Willett
- Brigadier General Otho Holland Williams
- Major David Ziegler

== Notable hereditary members ==
=== Military and naval officers ===
- General Charles C. Krulak, USMC - Commandant of the Marine Corps.
- General Peyton C. March - U.S. Army Chief of Staff.
- General David Patreaus - Commander of coalition forces in Iraq and Afghanistan.
- General John K. Waters – Career Army officer.
- Admiral Hilary P. Jones – United States Battle Fleet Commander.
- Admiral John S. McCain Sr. – Admiral during World War II and grandfather of former U.S. Senator John McCain.
- Admiral John S. McCain Jr. – Commander of United States Pacific Command during the Vietnam War, and father of U.S. Senator John McCain. The two McCains are the only father-and-son four-star admirals in U.S. Navy history.
- Admiral Thomas Washington - Commander of the Atlantic Fleet during World War I.
- Admiral Cameron McRae Winslow – Admiral during World War I.
- Lieutenant General Ridgely Gaither – Career Army officer.
- Lieutenant General, Governor and Senator Wade Hampton III
- Lieutenant General John C.H. Lee – Commander of the Services of Supply in the European Theater.
- Lieutenant General Edward H. Brooks – World War II Corps Commander and World War I recipient of Distinguished Service Cross.
- Vice Admiral Walden L. Ainsworth - Recipient of the Navy Cross.
- Major General Lytle Brown – Chief Engineer of the U.S. Army.
- Major General Preston Brown - Career Army officer.
- Major General Silas Casey, USV – Civil War general.
- Major General Thomas L. Crittenden, USV – Civil War general.
- Major General Henry A. S. Dearborn – President General of the Society and congressman.
- Major General William B. Franklin – Veteran of the Mexican War and the Civil War.
- Major General Edgar Erskine Hume – President General of the Society.
- Major General Charles Evans Kilbourne II - Medal of Honor recipient.
- Major General Cortlandt Parker - Veteran of both world wars.
- Major General John Patten Story - Chief of Artillery for the U.S. Army.
- Major General Edwin Vose Sumner Jr. – Civil War and Spanish–American War veteran.
- Major General Charles Elliot Warren - Commandant of the Veteran Corps of Artillery
- Rear Admiral Conway Hillyer Arnold - Spanish-American War veteran.
- Rear Admiral Charles Henry Davis – Mexican and Civil War veteran.
- Rear Admiral Henry Clay Taylor - Civil War and Spanish-American War veteran.
- Rear Admiral Henry Thatcher – Grandson of Major General Henry Knox and Civil War veteran.
- Rear Admiral Nathan Crook Twining
- Brevet Major General Nicholas Longworth Anderson
- Brevet Major General Henry Jackson Hunt, USV – Union general in the Civil War.
- Brigadier General William Bancroft – Mayor of Cambridge, Massachusetts, and general during the Spanish–American War.
- Brigadier General Theodore A. Bingham - Police commissioner of New York City.
- Brigadier General Thomas Lincoln Casey – Army engineer who oversaw completion of the Washington Monument.
- Brigadier General Thomas L. Crittenden – Civil War general.
- Brigadier General John Ross Delafield
- Brigadier General and President Franklin Pierce (Only president of the United States to be a hereditary member.)
- Brigadier General Cornelius Vanderbilt III, NA – World War I veteran.
- Brevet Brigadier General Hazard Stevens, USV – Medal of Honor recipient.
- Commodore Alfred Brooks Fry, NYNM – Marine engineer.
- Colonel Joseph Warren Scott - Longtime Treasurer General of the Society.
- Captain Roy Campbell Smith, USN - Naval Governor of Guam
- Lieutenant Colonel Asa Bird Gardiner – Secretary General of the Society.
- Lieutenant Colonel Frederick Lippitt, RING – Philanthropist.
- Lieutenant Colonel Benjamin Kendrick Pierce – Elder brother of President Franklin Pierce and veteran of the War of 1812, the Seminole War, and the Mexican War.
- Commander Herbert C. Pell IV, USCGR - Lawyer.
- Major Archibald Butt – Presidential military aide who died on the Titanic.
- Major Cornelius Vanderbilt IV, AUS – Newspaper editor.
- Major William Wayne, Union Army - Pennsylvania state politician.

=== Government officials ===
- President Franklin Pierce
- Rt. Hon. Sir Winston Churchill KG, CH, FRS – Hereditary member of the Connecticut Society; his great-grandson, Duncan Sandys, is currently a hereditary member of the Massachusetts Society.
- Secretary of State, Senator and Governor Hamilton Fish – Long-time President General of the Society.
- Secretary of State Edward Livingston
- Secretary of State Louis McLane
- Secretary of War Newton D. Baker
- Supreme Court Justice Oliver Wendell Holmes Jr.
- Supreme Court Justice Stanley Forman Reed
- Under Secretary of State Frank Polk
- Governor and United States Senator William H. Bulkeley – Governor of Connecticut and president of Aetna Insurance Company.
- Governor Horatio Seymour – Governor of New York.
- Governor DeWitt Clinton – Governor of New York, U.S. Senator, and Mayor of New York City.
- Governor Robert Fiske Bradford – Governor of Massachusetts.
- Governor Wade Hampton III – Governor of South Carolina.
- Governor William W. Hoppin – Governor of Rhode Island.
- Governor Charles Warren Lippitt – Governor of Rhode Island.
- Governor Robert Milligan McLane – Governor of Maryland and ambassador to France.
- Governor LeBaron Bradford Prince – Governor of New Mexico Territory.
- Governor Thomas Stockton – Governor of Delaware.
- Governor and Senator George Peabody Wetmore
- Ambassador Larz Anderson – Socialite and diplomat.
- Ambassador Robert W. Bingham
- Minister Nicholas Fish II – Minister to Belgium.
- Ambassador Howard H. Leach
- Ambassador Thomas R. Pickering
- Ambassador Horace Porter
- Senator Warren R. Austin
- Senator James Watson – United States Senator from New York; a founder (1805) and the first president of the New England Society of New York.
- Senator Chauncey Depew – Founder of the Pilgrims Society.
- Senator Theodore Francis Green – United States Senator from Rhode Island.
- Senator Charles Mathias – United States Senator from Maryland.
- Senator Claiborne Pell – Long-serving Senator from Rhode Island.
- Senator George H. Pendleton - United States Senator from Ohio.
- Senator Hugh Doggett Scott Jr. – Congressman and United States senator from Pennsylvania.
- Senator Charles Sumner – Abolitionist senator from Massachusetts.
- Congressman Perry Belmont
- Congressman Horace Binney
- Congressman Hamilton Fish II
- Congressman Hamilton Fish III – College Football Hall of Fame inductee.
- Congressman Foster Stearns
- Chief Justice of the South Carolina Supreme Court Milledge Lipscomb Bonham
- Maryland Secretary of State Oswald Tilghman
- Mayor of Chicago Carter Harrison IV
- United States Attorney George Read III
- Collector of the Port of Boston Winslow Warren - President General of the Society.

=== Others ===
- Captain Waldron Phoenix Belknap Jr. – art historian, architect, and soldier
- Henry L. P. Beckwith – Heraldist, historian, and genealogist. Living and self-listed.
- Major John Vernou Bouvier III, NA – Stockbroker and socialite.
- John Nicholas Brown I – Book collector and philanthropist.
- The Honorable John Nicholas Brown – Philanthropist.
- Joseph Cotten – Actor
- Lieutenant Robert David Lion Gardiner, USNR - Lord of the manor of Gardiner's Island.
- Benjamin Apthorp Gould – Astronomer.
- Reverend Alexander Hamilton – great-grandson of Alexander Hamilton
- Commodore Arthur Curtiss James, NYYC – Investor and yachtsman.
- 1st Lieutenant Henry B. Ledyard Jr. - Railroad executive.
- Lewis Cass Ledyard – Lawyer and socialite.
- Lieutenant Colonel Frederick Lippitt, RING – Philanthropist.
- Lieutenant Colonel Alfred Lee Loomis – Scientist and inventor.
- Louis Lasher Lorillard - Tobacco heir and yachtsman.
- Prince Louis, Duke of Anjou – Claimant to the French throne. (Representing King Louis XVI.)
- The Right Reverend James DeWolf Perry – Presiding bishop of the Episcopal Church.
- The Right Reverend William Stevens Perry – Episcopal bishop of Iowa.
- Sylvanus Albert Reed – Aeronautical engineer.
- Colonel Charles L.F. Robinson, RIM - President of Colt Firearms.
- Alexander H. Rice Jr. – Geographer.
- Roderick Terry - Clergyman and philanthropist.
- Henry E. Turner - Physician.
- Alexander S. Webb – Banker.

== Notable honorary members ==
Since its inception, the Society of the Cincinnati has allowed honorary members to be admitted who have distinguished themselves in military or public service.

=== Presidents of the United States ===
- Andrew Jackson
- Zachary Taylor
- James Buchanan
- Ulysses S. Grant
- Grover Cleveland
- Benjamin Harrison
- William McKinley
- Theodore Roosevelt
- William Howard Taft
- Woodrow Wilson
- Warren G. Harding
- Franklin D. Roosevelt
- Harry S. Truman
- Ronald Reagan
- George H. W. Bush

A total of 18 Presidents of the United States have been members of the Society of the Cincinnati. Every president who served in the eras of 1885 to 1923 (38 years), 1933 to 1953 (20 years), and 1981 to 1993 (12 years) was an honorary member of the Society. No president since 1993 has been a member of the Society.

Presidents George Washington and James Monroe were original members of the Society, and President Franklin Pierce was a hereditary member. Zachary Taylor was admitted as an honorary member of the New York Society in 1847 and could have been a hereditary member of the Virginia Society by right of his father, Lieutenant Colonel Richard Taylor (d. 1826), had it been active at the time of his father's death. Fourteen other presidents were elected as honorary members.

=== Foreign Heads of State ===
- King of the Belgians Albert I
- Marshal of France Philippe Pétain
- King Gustaf VI Adolf of Sweden
- President of France Valéry Giscard d'Estaing
- President of France Emile Loubet
- President of France Nicolas Sarkozy

=== Nobel Peace Prize recipients ===
- Theodore Roosevelt (1906)
- Elihu Root (1912)
- Woodrow Wilson (1919)
- Cordell Hull (1945)
- George C. Marshall (1953)

(Nobel Prize for Literature recipient Winston Churchill was a hereditary member of the Society.)

=== Naval officers ===
- Admiral of the Navy George Dewey
- Fleet Admiral William D. Leahy
- Fleet Admiral Ernest J. King
- Fleet Admiral Chester W. Nimitz
- Fleet Admiral William Halsey
- Admiral David G. Farragut
- Admiral David Dixon Porter
- Admiral William S. Sims
- Admiral Arleigh Burke
- Admiral James L. Holloway III
- Rear Admiral Caspar F. Goodrich
- Rear Admiral Samuel E. Morison
- Rear Admiral Alan Shepard
- Rear Admiral Charles Stewart
- Commodore William Bainbridge
- Commodore Stephen Decatur
- Commodore Isaac Hull
- Commodore Jacob Jones
- Commodore Thomas Macdonough
- Commodore Matthew C. Perry
- Commodore Oliver Hazard Perry
- Commodore Lewis Warrington
- Captain Jesse Elliott
- Captain Thomas Hudner, MOH
- Captain James Lawrence
- Captain Thomas Truxton

=== Marine Corps officers ===
- General Thomas Holcomb
- Major General John A. Lejeune
- General Lemuel C. Shepherd Jr.

=== Army officers ===
- General of the Armies John J. Pershing
- General of the Army George C. Marshall
- General of the Army Douglas MacArthur
- General of the Army Omar Bradley
- General Ulysses S. Grant
- General William T. Sherman
- General Philip H. Sheridan
- General Mark Clark
- General Lucius D. Clay
- General Matthew B. Ridgway
- General Norman Schwarzkopf
- General William Westmoreland
- General John W. Nicholson Jr.
- Lieutenant General John M. Schofield
- Lieutenant General Nelson A. Miles
- Lieutenant General Adna R. Chaffee
- Lieutenant General Wade Hampton III, CSA
- Brevet Lieutenant General Winfield Scott
- Major General Jacob Brown
- Major General Winfield Scott Hancock
- Major General Oliver O. Howard
- Major General Frank O. Hunter
- Major General George G. Meade
- Major General Lewis Morris
- Major General James Parker
- Major General Hugh L. Scott
- Major General Leonard Wood
- Major General John E. Wool
- Brevet Major General Robert Anderson
- Brevet Major General George Cadwalader
- Brevet Major General Stephen W. Kearny
- Brevet Major General Galusha Pennypacker
- Brevet Major General Nathan Towson
- Brevet Major General Alexander S. Webb
- Brevet Major General William Jenkins Worth
- Brigadier General and Senator Frederick Frelinghuysen
- Brigadier General and Sears Roebuck Chairman Robert E. Wood
- Brigadier General John W. Nicholson
- Brevet Brigadier General William Belknap
- Brevet Brigadier General, Ambassador to France, and Medal of Honor recipient Horace Porter
- Colonel Samuel Miles
- Brevet Lieutenant Colonel and Medal of Honor recipient Henry A. Dupont

=== Government officials ===
- Secretary of the Navy Charles Francis Adams III
- Secretary of War Newton D. Baker
- Secretary of State James F. Byrnes
- Postmaster General Benjamin Franklin
- Secretary of the Army Gordon Gray
- Secretary of State Cordell Hull
- Secretary of State and Senator Elihu Root
- Secretary of State and Senator Daniel Webster
- Attorney General Elliot L. Richardson
- Supreme Court Justice Owen Roberts
- Governor William Paca
- Governor Colgate Darden
- Governor Elisha Dyer
- Governor Elisha Dyer, Jr.
- Governor John Franklin Fort
- Governor Marcus H. Holcomb
- Governor Charles Dean Kimball
- Governor John A. King
- Governor Everett Lake
- Governor and Senator Leverett Saltonstall
- Governor Jonathan Trumbull
- Governor George H. Utter
- Governor George Theodore Werts
- Governor Benjamin Pierce (governor)
- Senator Charles Carroll of Carrollton
- Senator Frederick Theodore Frelinghuysen
- Senator Henry A. du Pont
- Senator Walter F. George
- Senator Rufus King
- Senator Henry Cabot Lodge Jr.
- Senator Gouverneur Morris
- Senator William Paine Sheffield Sr.
- Senator John P. Stockton
- Senator Daniel Webster
- Congressman Butler Ames
- Congressman Charles S. Dewey
- Congressman William Paine Sheffield Jr.
- Delegate William Floyd
- Ambassador Amory Houghton
- Ambassador Weston Adams (diplomat)
- Ambassador Francis L. Kellogg
- Ambassador J. William Middendorf
- Lieutenant Governor Stephen Van Rensselaer
- Lieutenant Governor Pierre Van Cortlandt
- Chancellor Robert R. Livingston
- Justice James T. Mitchell
- Judge Hardy Cross Dillard
- Judge Charles G. Garrison
- Mayor Louis R. Cheney
- FBI Director J. Edgar Hoover
- Commissary General John Barker Church

=== Civilians ===
- Businessman Butler Ames
- Yale University President James Rowland Angell
- Socialite Perry Belmont
- Columbia University President Nicholas M. Butler
- Industrialist Pierre S. du Pont
- Yale President Timothy Dwight IV
- Yale President Timothy Dwight V
- Minister Stephen Gano
- Professor John B. Hattendorf
- Harvard University President A. Lawrence Lowell
- Architect George Champlin Mason Sr.
- Historian Samuel E. Morison
- Historian John Howland Gibbs Pell
- Historian William H. Prescott
- Philanthropist John D. Rockefeller Jr.
- Yale President Charles Seymour
- Banker and Socialite William Watts Sherman
- Yale President Ezra Stiles
- Sculptor William Greene Turner
- Surgeon John Collins Warren
- Lawyer Charles C. Glover III

=== Foreigners ===
- Marshal of France Ferdinand Foch
- Marshal of France Robert Nivelle

== See also ==
- Daughters of the Cincinnati
- Military Order of Foreign Wars
- Military Order of the Loyal Legion of the United States
- Order of the Founders and Patriots of America
- Sons of the American Revolution
- Sons of the Revolution

== Bibliography ==
- Buck, William Bowen. The Society of the Cincinnati in the State of New Jersey. The John L. Murphy Publishing Company, Printers for the Society of the Cincinnati in New Jersey, 1898.
- Callahan, North (1958). Henry Knox: General Washington's General. Rinehart.
- Chernow, Ron (2010). Washington: A Life. Penguin Press. ISBN 978-1-59420-266-7.
- Davis, Curtis Carroll. Revolution's Godchild: The Birth, Death, and Regeneration of the Society of the Cincinnati in North Carolina. The University of North Carolina Press for the North Carolina Society of the Cincinnati, 1976.
- Doyle, William (2009). "Chapter 4: "Aristocracy Avoided: America and the Cincinnati"". Aristocracy and its enemies in the age of revolution. Oxford University Press. pp. 86–137. ISBN 978-0199559855.
- Hill, Steven. The Delaware Cincinnati: 1783-1988. Dorrance & Company, Inc. for the Delaware Cincinnati Charitable Trust, 1988.
- Hoey, Edwin. "A New and Strange Order of Men," American Heritage. (v. 19, issue 5) August 1968.
- Hume, Edgar Erskine. General Washington's Correspondence Concerning The Society of the Cincinnati. Baltimore: The Johns Hopkins Press, 1941.
- Hünemörder, Markus. The Society of the Cincinnati: Conspiracy and Distrust in Early America. Berghahn Books, 2006.
- Lossing, Benson John Pictorial Fieldbook of the Revolution. Volume I. 1850.
- Metcalf, Bryce. Original Members and Other Officers Eligible to the Society of the Cincinnati. Shenandoah Publishing House, Inc., 1938.
- Myers, Minor. Liberty Without Anarchy: A History of the Society of the Cincinnati. University of Virginia Press, 1983.
- Olson, Lester C. Benjamin Franklin's Vision of American Community: A Study in Rhetorical Iconology. University of South Carolina Press, 2004.
- Puls, Mark (2008). Henry Knox: Visionary General of the American Revolution. St. Martin's Press. ISBN 978-0-2306-1142-9.
- Thomas, William Sturgis, Members of the Society of the Cincinnati, Original, Hereditary and Honorary; With a Brief Account of the Society's History and Aims New York: T.A. Wright, 1929.
- Warren, Winslow. The Society of the Cincinnati: A History of the General Society of the Cincinnati with the Institution of the Order, Massachusetts Society of the Cincinnati, 1929.
