= Oliver Perry Monument =

Statue of Oliver Hazard Perry in Newport, Rhode Island

- United States
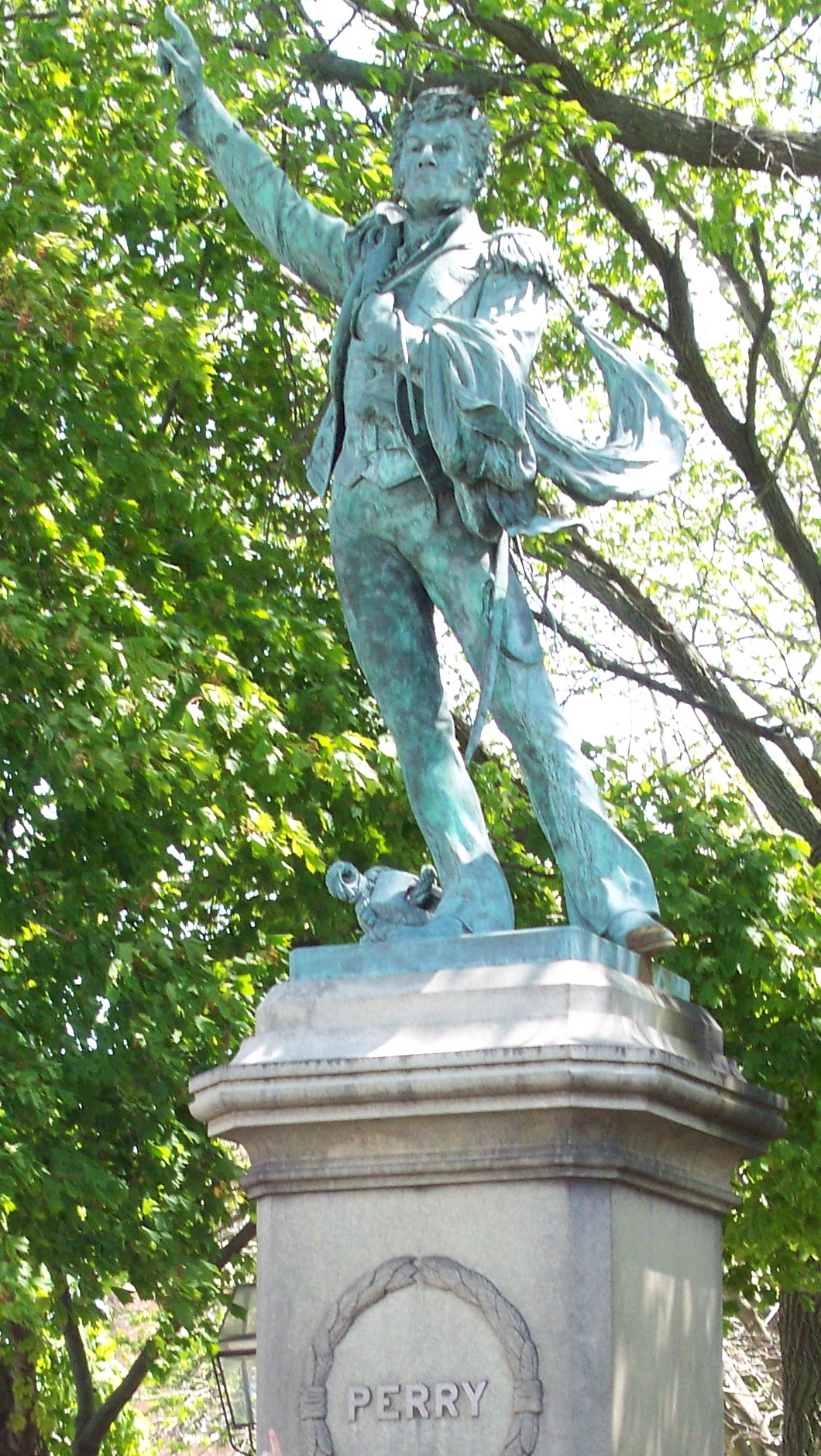
- Commodore Oliver Hazard Perry
- For Commodore Oliver Hazard Perry
- Unveiled: September 10, 1885
- Location: 41.48997°N 71.31425°W near Newport, RI
- Designed by: William Greene Turner
- PERRY

Oliver Perry Monument is a bronze statue, by William Greene Turner, dedicated to Commodore Oliver Hazard Perry. It is located in Eisenhower Park in Newport, RI, between Washington Square and Touro street. The statue faces west towards Newport Harbor.

The inscription reads:

(On bronze plinth:)
W. G. Turner sc 1884 Gli Galli fusero
Firenze 1884
(In raised letters, encircled by carved wreath:)

PERRY

(Back of base:)

"WE HAVE MET THE ENEMY AND THEY ARE OURS"
SEPT. 13TH 1813.

signed Founder's mark.

The statue was dedicated 10 September 1885, the 72nd anniversary of the Battle of Lake Erie. The monument is described as

Full-length standing portrait of Oliver H. Perry, seen in the Battle of Lake Erie in the War of 1812, just as he mounted the deck of the Niagara, after the dismantling of his own ship, the Lawrence, and after he rowed across the lake in enemy fire. His proper right arm is extended in a gesture of command; the flag from Lawrence is draped around his proper left arm. At the foot of the monument is a block and coil of rope.

— Smithsonian Institution
