= Matthew Perry Monument =

Statue in the United States

- United States
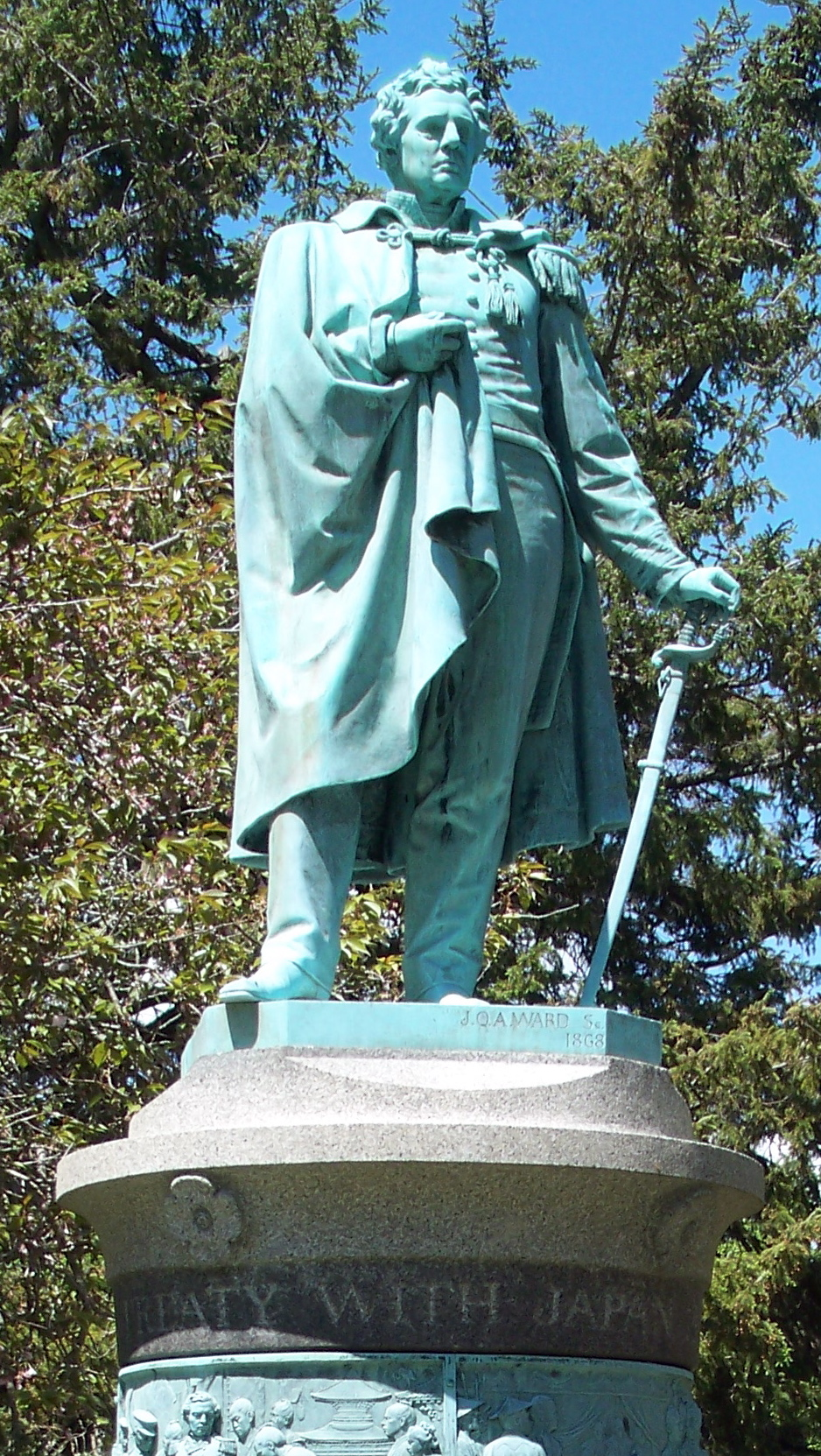
- Matthew Perry statue in Touro Park, Newport, RI
- For Commodore Matthew Perry
- Unveiled: May 1869
- Location: 41.485719°N 71.309426°W near Newport, Rhode Island
- Designed by: John Quincy Adams Ward

Matthew Perry Monument is a statue commemorating Commodore Matthew C. Perry. The statue is situated in Touro Park facing Bellevue Avenue in the heart of Newport, Rhode Island and was designed by John Quincy Adams Ward in 1869. The pedestal was designed by Richard Morris Hunt.

The statue is described:

Standing figure of Perry wearing his Naval uniform with tassels on the shoulders and a cape jacket draped over his proper right shoulder. His proper left hand rests on the hilt of a sword. The circular base has four bronze bas-reliefs that represent events in Perry's life: Africa (1843), Mexico (1846) and the Treaty with Japan (1[8]54)--Reception of President's letter and negotiation of the Treaty.

—Smithsonian Institution
