= List of public art in Newport, Wales =

This is a list of public art in Newport, South Wales.

Image	Title / subject	Location and coordinates	Date	Artist / designer	Architect / other	Type	Material	Designation	Wikidata	Notes
More images	Sir Charles Morgan, 2nd Baronet	Bridge Street	1848	John Evan Thomas	—	Seated statue on pedestal	Bronze & stone	Grade II	Q29483019	
	War memorial	Clarence Place	1923	Cyril Bates & Colin Jones	—	Cenotaph	Limestone	Grade II	Q29503127	
	History of Newport	Central Hall, Newport Civic Centre	1964	Hans Feibusch & Phyllis Bray	12 murals	Paint	Each mural approx 8m high by 4 to 4.5m wide	Grade II* Listed building		.
More images	Archform	Newport railway station	1980		—	Sculpture	Steel	—		
More images	Stand and Stare, a tribute to W.H. Davies	Commercial Street, Newport	1990	Paul Bothwell Kincaid	—	Sculpture	Bronze	—		
More images	The Steel Wave	Riverside at Town Reach	1991	Pete Fink	—	Sculpture	Steel	—		
More images	Unity, Prudence, Energy - the Chartist Commemoration Sculpture	Commercial Road	Unveiled 1990	Christopher Kelly	—	Four-part sculpture group	Bronze	—		
	Merchant Navy Memorial	Gilligan's Island	1990–91	Sebastien Boyesen	—	Statue on column	Bronze, stone, cast stone	—		
More images	The Vision of Saint Gwynllyw		1993–1996	Sebastien Boyesen	—	Statue	Bronze	—		
	This Little Piggy Went to Market	Upper Dock Street	1994	Sebastien Boyesen	—	Statue	Bronze	—		
	Mural for the Library, Art Gallery and Museum	Newport Museum and Art Gallery, John Frost Square	1995	Sebastien Boyesen	—	Mural	Aluminium tiles	—		
	VEVJ Memorial	Commercial Street	1995	Sebastien Boyesen	—	Mural	Granite, etched and cast bronze	—		
More images	David "Bomber" Pearce Boxing Memorial	Riverside at Kutaisi Walk	2018	Laury Dizengremel	—	Statue	Bronze			
	Margaret Haig Thomas, 2nd Viscountess Rhondda	Millennium Walk	2024	Jane Robbins	—	Statue	Bronze			

== Public art formerly in Newport ==
Image	Title / subject	Location and coordinates	Date	Artist / designer	Architect / other	Type	Material	Designation	Notes	
	Chartist Mural	51.58689°N 2.99419°W	1978	Kenneth Budd	—	Mural		—		Controversially destroyed in 2013

== Bibliography ==
- Boyesen, Sebastien (1998), The Vision of Saint Gwynllyw and Other Stories, Llandysul: Gomer
