= Alexander Stewart Webb (banker) =

Alexander Stewart Webb Jr.

President of the ASPCA
- In office 1937–1947
- Preceded by: George Muirson Woolsey
- Succeeded by: John D. Beals, Jr.

Personal details
- Born: February 5, 1870 New York City, New York, U.S.
- Died: January 22, 1948 (aged 77) Mineola, New York, U.S.
- Spouse: Florence Sands Russell (m. 1916; died 1941)
- Relations: William Webb (uncle); Henry Webb (uncle); James Watson Webb (grandfather)
- Parent(s): Anna Elizabeth Remsen; Alexander Stewart Webb

Alexander Stewart Webb Jr. (February 5, 1870 – January 22, 1948) was an American banker and philanthropist who was prominent in New York society during the Gilded Age.

== Early life ==
Webb was born in New York City on February 5, 1870. He was the second son of eight children born to Alexander Stewart Webb and Anna Elizabeth Remsen (1837–1912). His siblings included, Helen Lispenard Webb, who married John Ernest Alexandre; Elizabeth Remsen Webb, who married George Burrington Parsons; Anne Remsen Webb, who did not marry and lived with her sister Caroline; Caroline LeRoy Webb, who also did not marry; William Remsen Webb, who died unmarried; and Louise de Peyster Webb, who married William John Wadsworth in 1904.

His maternal grandparents were Henry Rutgers Remsen and Elizabeth Waldron (née Phoenix) Remsen. His paternal grandparents were Helen Lispenard (née Stewart) Webb and James Watson Webb, a former regular army officer who was a well-known newspaper owner and diplomat (serving as U.S. Minister to Brazil in 1861). After his grandmother's death in 1848, his grandfather remarried to Laura Virginia Cram, with whom he also had several children, including William Seward Webb, a doctor and financier who was married to Eliza Osgood Vanderbilt (granddaughter of Cornelius Vanderbilt), and Henry Walter Webb, a railroad executive. His paternal great-grandfather, Samuel Blatchley Webb, served on George Washington's staff during the American Revolutionary War, and another great-grandparent was Sarah Amelia (née Lispenard) Stewart (herself the great-granddaughter of merchant Leonard Lispenard and a descendant of the Roosevelt family).

== Career ==
In 1889, Webb began his career in finance as a messenger at Lincoln National Bank. He later worked for Metropolitan National Bank becoming secretary in 1900, which merged with First Chicago Bank in 1902. Thereafter, he became the secretary of the New York Trust Company in 1902, followed by vice-president in 1904 (Otto T. Bannard served as president). The New York Trust Company was a large trust and wholesale-banking business that eventually into Chemical Bank (today known as JPMorgan Chase), following the Panic of 1907.

In 1908, he returned to Lincoln National Bank as president, and served there until it was absorbed by the Mechanics and Metals National Bank. Beginning in 1922, he was vice-president of the Mechanics and Metals National Bank during which time it held a small ownership position in the Bank of Central and South America. The Bank was consolidated with Chase National Bank in 1926.

In 1927, he was chosen to serve as the president of the Seward National Bank, what was absorbed into the Bank of Manhattan Trust Company. Beginning in 1932, he was vice-president of the Bank of Manhattan Trust Company. Webb retired from his long career in finance in 1935.

=== Philanthropy ===
Webb was elected to the board of the American Society for the Prevention of Cruelty to Animals, commonly known as the ASPCA, in 1915 and served for thirty-five years. In addition, he was chosen as treasurer in 1924 and served as president of the Society for ten years from 1937 until 1947.

He was also a member of the board of the American Humane Association and a founder, trustee, and treasurer of the Tuberculosis Preventorium for Children of New York.

=== Society life ===
In 1892, Webb was included in Ward McAllister's "Four Hundred", purported to be an index of New York's best families, published in The New York Times. Conveniently, 400 was the number of people that could fit into Mrs. Astor's ballroom.

He was a member of the St. Nicholas Society, the Empire States Society of the Sons of the American Revolution, the New York Society of Colonial Wars, the Connecticut Society of the Cincinnati (elected in 1912) and the New York Commandery of the Military Order of the Loyal Legion of the United States by right of his father's service in the Civil War. He belonged to the Piping Rock Club, the Meadow Brook Club, the Union Club of the City of New York, the Knickerbocker Club and the Manhattan Club.

== Personal life ==
On May 10, 1916, Webb was married to Florence (née Sands) Russell (1871–1941), the widow of architect William Hamilton Russell. Florence was the daughter of James W. Sands and Eliza J. Sands and was the mother of William Hamilton Russell Jr., a Harvard student at the time of their marriage, from her first marriage to Russell. Webb lived in New York City and had a home known as "The Oaks" in Roslyn, New York.

Florence's son William married Marie Johnson, the daughter of minister and financier Bradish Johnson and the grandson of industrialist Bradish Johnson.

His wife died in September 1941. After his wife's death, Webb and his sister Caroline lived at the Garden City Hotel in Garden City, New York. Webb died at Nassau Hospital in Mineola, New York on Thursday January 22, 1948.

== Bibliography ==
- Bruner, Robert F.; Carr, Sean D. (2007), The Panic of 1907: Lessons Learned from the Market's Perfect Storm, Hoboken, New Jersey: John Wiley & Sons, ISBN 978-0-470-15263-8
