= Horace Webster =

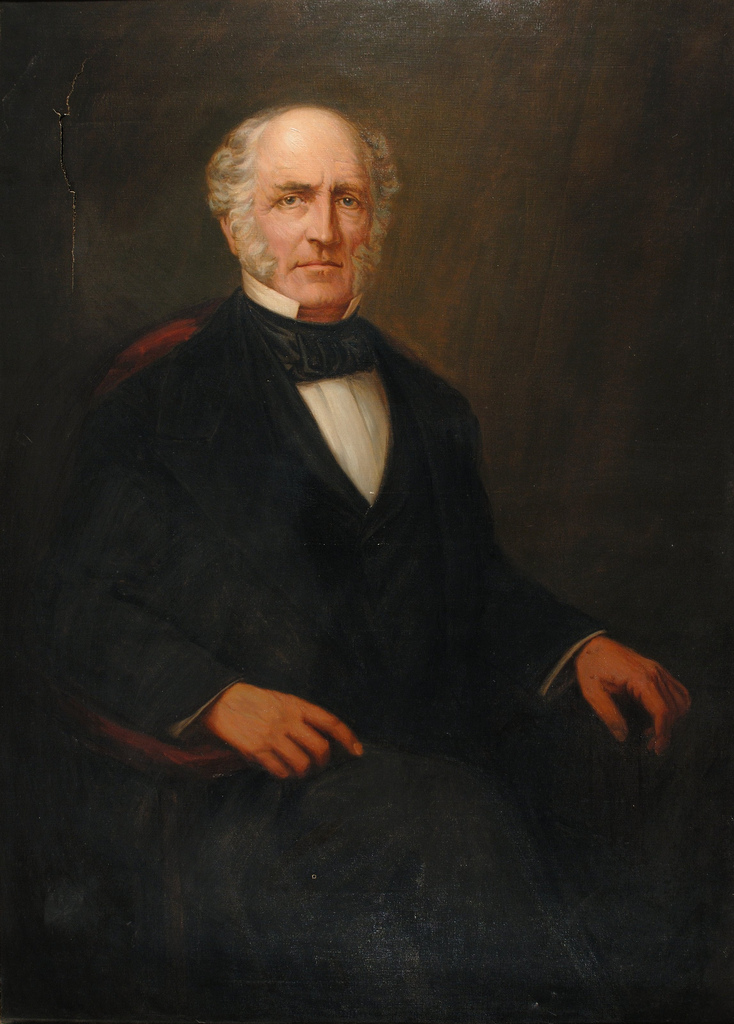
- 1930 portrait of Horace Webster by Julia Redding Kelly (1873-1939)

1st President of City College of New York
- In office 1847–1869
- Succeeded by: Alexander S. Webb

Personal details
- Born: September 21, 1794 Hartford, Vermont
- Died: July 12, 1871 (aged 76) Geneva, New York

Horace Webster (Hartford, Vermont, September 21, 1794- Geneva, New York, July 12, 1871) was an American educator who graduated from the United States Military Academy in 1818. Webster remained at West Point as a mathematics professor until 1825, leaving with the rank of first lieutenant. He then moved to Geneva College, where he taught as a professor of mathematics and natural philosophy until he left in 1848 to head the Free Academy of New York, where he continued until retirement in 1869. The school was renamed City College in 1866. Horace Webster served as its first president.

Academic offices
| Preceded by New Position | President of City College of New York; 1847–1869 | Succeeded by Alexander S. Webb |
