= William Greene Turner =

American sculptor

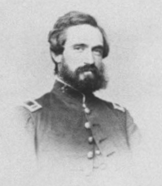
- Born: October 21, 1833; Newport, Rhode Island
- Died: 1917; Newport, Rhode Island
- Known for: sculpture

William Greene Turner (October 21, 1833 – 1917) was an American sculptor.

== Early life ==
Turner was born at Newport, Rhode Island, the son of James Varnum Turner and Catherine (Greene) Turner.

== Civil War service ==
During his adult life, Turner was a dentist before the outbreak of the American Civil War. He enlisted as a sergeant in Company K of the 2nd Rhode Island Infantry on June 5, 1861. Coincidentally, Company K was commanded by his brother, Captain Charles W. Turner, who had previously been commander of the Newport Artillery Company. On July 22 he was then commissioned as a 2nd lieutenant to fill a vacancy resulting from a casualty during the Battle of Bull Run which was fought the day before. He was promoted to 1st lieutenant on November 28, 1861 to fill a vacancy created by his brother's resignation from the Army.

Turner was promoted to captain in command of Company G of the 2nd Rhode Island on April 4, 1863. Shortly after assuming command of G Company, he was wounded on May 3 at the Battle of Salem Church, Virginia during the Chancellorsville Campaign. On May 11, he sent to his brother Dr. Henry E. Turner (1816-1897), who was serving as a contract surgeon at Fort Adams, a short telegram - "Wounded in front of bladder. Pocket book saved my life. Not serious."

On account of his wounds, Captain Turner was discharged from the Army on July 21, 1863. He was subsequently sent by his family to Italy, since it was assumed the climate would improve his health.

== Artistic career ==
In Italy, Turner became immediately enamored of the works of the Italian Renaissance sculptors and especially those in Florence, where he was lodging. Turner (under the sponsorship of his uncle William Greene of East Greenwich, R.I.) chose to remain in Florence for the next thirty years taking a studio there. He took numerous commissions both from private sources and from the newly formed Italian government. Both the Redwood Library and the Newport Historical Society have examples of his work in marble and alabaster.

He became (as was often the fashion of the day), an American expatriate choosing to study and master his art abroad. His works were shown in Rome and Paris at various expositions during the 1870s and 1880s.

Among the more famous of Turner's American works is his bronze Oliver Perry Monument, which was unveiled on 10 September 1885 at the Parade (now known as Eisenhower Park) on Washington Square in Newport, Rhode Island.

In 1890 Turner was elected as an honorary member of the Rhode Island Society of the Cincinnati.

During the second decade of the twentieth century, William Greene Turner moved home to Newport from Italy and spent his remaining days doing commissions in the United States. His bust of his brother, famed Newport horticulturist Doctor Henry E. Turner, is among the possessions of the Newport Historical Society.

== Personal life ==
William Greene Turner never married. He died in 1917 and is buried in the Island Cemetery in Newport.
