= Alexander S. Webb =

American Army officer and Union general (1835–1911)

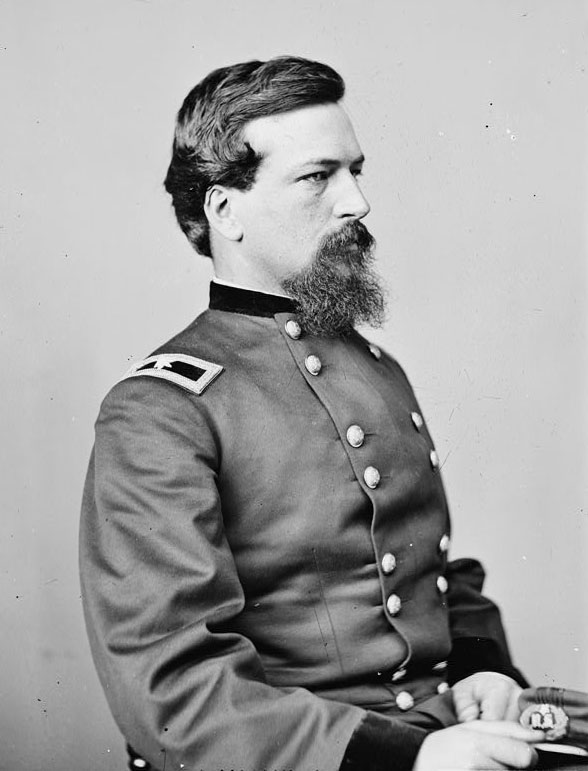
- Webb c. 1860–65

2nd President of City College of New York
- In office 1869–1902
- Preceded by: Horace Webster
- Succeeded by: John Huston Finley

Personal details
- Born: February 15, 1835 New York City, New York
- Died: February 12, 1911 (aged 75) Riverdale, Bronx, New York
- Resting place: West Point Cemetery
- Spouse: Anna Elizabeth Remsen (m. 1855)
- Relations: William Webb (brother); Henry Webb (brother)
- Children: 8, including Alexander Stewart Webb Jr.
- Parent: James Watson Webb (father)
- Education: United States Military Academy
- Awards: Medal of Honor

Military service
- Allegiance: United States (Union)
- Branch/service: U.S. Army (Union Army)
- Years of service: 1855–1870
- Rank: Brigadier general; Brevet Major general
- Commands: Philadelphia Brigade; 2nd Division, II Corps
- Battles/wars: 3rd Seminole War; American Civil War; First Battle of Bull Run; Battle of Malvern Hill; Battle of Gettysburg; Battle of Bristoe Station; Battle of Spotsylvania Court House

Alexander Stewart Webb (February 15, 1835 – February 12, 1911) was a career United States Army officer and a Union general in the American Civil War who received the Medal of Honor for gallantry at the Battle of Gettysburg. After the war, he was a prominent member of New York society and served as president of the City College of New York for thirty-three years.

== Early life ==
Alexander Webb was born in New York City on February 15, 1835, to a prominent family with a strong military lineage. He was the son of Helen Lispenard (née Stewart) Webb and James Watson Webb, a former regular army officer who was a well-known newspaper owner and diplomat (serving as U.S. Minister to Brazil in 1861). After his mother's death in 1848, his father remarried to Laura Virginia Cram, with whom he also had several children, including William Seward Webb, a doctor and financier who was married to Eliza Osgood Vanderbilt (granddaughter of Cornelius Vanderbilt), and Henry Walter Webb, a railroad executive.

His paternal grandfather, Samuel Blatchley Webb, was wounded at the Battle of Bunker Hill and served on George Washington's staff during the American Revolutionary War, and his paternal grandmother, Catherine Louisa (née Hogeboom) Webb, whose family was long associated with the Van Rensselaers of New York. His maternal grandparents were Alexander L. Stewart and Sarah Amelia (née Lispenard) Stewart (the great-granddaughter of merchant Leonard Lispenard and a descendant of the Roosevelt family).

== Career ==
After preparing at Colonel Churchill's Military School in Sing Sing, New York (now Ossining, New York), Webb entered the United States Military Academy at West Point, graduating in 1855, ranking 13 out of 34. He was commissioned a brevet second lieutenant in the 4th U.S. Artillery and was sent to Florida to serve in the Seminole War. After serving his duty in Florida, he was given an appointment to serve as an instructor of mathematics at West Point.

=== Civil War ===
At the outbreak of the Civil War, Webb took part in the defense of Fort Pickens, Florida, was present at the First Battle of Bull Run, and was aide-de-camp to Brig. Gen. William F. Barry, the chief of artillery of the Army of the Potomac, from July 1861 to April 1862. During the Peninsula Campaign, he served as Gen. Barry's assistant inspector general and received recognition for his assembling an impregnable line of artillery defense during the Battle of Malvern Hill; Brig. Gen. Daniel Butterfield wrote that Webb saved the Union Army from destruction.

During the Maryland Campaign and the Battle of Antietam, recently promoted to lieutenant colonel, he served as chief of staff in Maj. Gen. Fitz John Porter's V Corps. After Antietam, he was ordered to Washington, D.C., where he served as Inspector of Artillery. In January 1863 he was again assigned to the V Corps, now commanded by Maj. Gen. George G. Meade, and served again as chief of staff. During the Battle of Chancellorsville, Meade gave Webb temporary command of Brig. Gen. Erastus B. Tyler's brigade and thrust him into battle. He performed well and Meade in his report on the battle paid particular detail to Webb's "intelligence and zeal". On July 1, 1863, President Abraham Lincoln appointed Webb brigadier general, to rank from June 23, 1863. Three days before the Battle of Gettysburg, Brig. Gen. John Gibbon arrested the Philadelphia Brigade's commander, Brig. Gen. Joshua T. Owen, and Webb was given command of the brigade (the 2nd Brigade, 2nd Division, II Corps). Initially, the brigade resented having the meticulously groomed and well-dressed Webb as their commanding officer, but he soon earned their respect through his attention to detail, his affability, and his discipline.

=== Gettysburg ===
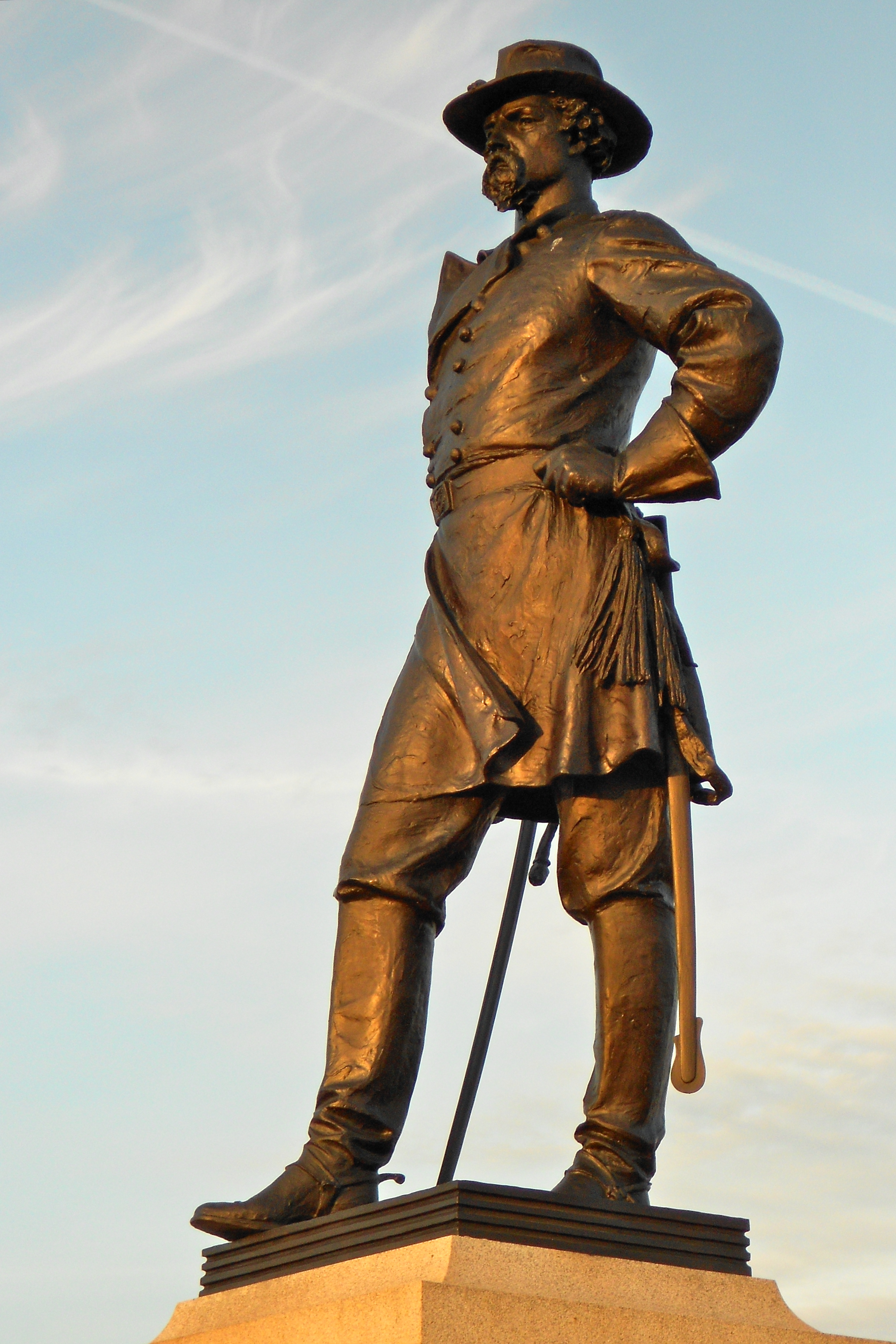
Statue at Gettysburg by J. Massey Rhind

When the Union Army repulsed the Confederates at Cemetery Hill, General Webb played a central role in the battle. Coddington wrote about Webb's conduct during Pickett's Charge: "Refusing to give up, [Webb] set an example of bravery and undaunted leadership for his men to follow...." Webb's brigade was posted on Cemetery Ridge with the rest of the II Corps on the morning of July 2, 1863. The brigade repulsed the assault of Brig. Gen. Ambrose R. Wright's brigade of Georgians as it topped the ridge late in the afternoon, chasing the Confederates back as far as the Emmitsburg Road, where they captured about 300 men and reclaimed a Union battery. Soon after, Webb sent two regiments to assist in counterattacking the assault of Maj. Gen. Jubal A. Early's division on Cemetery Hill.

On July 3, Webb's brigade happened to be in the center of the Union line to defend against Pickett's Charge, in front of the famous "Copse of Trees." As the Confederates launched a massive artillery barrage to prepare for their infantry assault, Webb made himself conspicuous to his men, many of whom were unfamiliar with their new commander. He stood in front of the line and leaned on his sword, puffing leisurely on a cigar while cannonballs whistled by and shells exploded all around. Although his men shouted at him to take shelter, he refused and impressed many with his personal bravery. As Maj. Gen. George Pickett's Virginia division approached to within a few yards, two companies of Webb's 71st Pennsylvania fell back, and Webb feared the personal disgrace and the results of a breakthrough in his line. He shouted to his neighboring 72nd Pennsylvania to charge, but they refused to budge. He attempted to grab their regimental colors and go forward with them himself, but apparently the standard bearer did not recognize him, because he fought Webb for the colors before he went down, shot numerous times. Webb ultimately gave up on the 72nd and strode directly in front of the chaos as Brig. Gen. Lewis Armistead's Confederate brigade breached the low stone wall, over to his 69th Pennsylvania regiment. Webb was wounded in his thigh and groin by a bullet, but kept going. With the help of two of Col. Norman J. Hall's New York regiments, and Brig. Gen. William Harrow's men, who ran over in a mass to get in their shots, Webb and his men brought the Confederate assault to a standstill, inflicting heavy casualties.

Webb received the Medal of Honor on September 28, 1891, for "distinguished personal gallantry in leading his men forward at a critical period in the contest" at Gettysburg on July 3, 1863. President Lincoln nominated Webb for appointment to the brevet grade of major general of volunteers for his service at Gettysburg, to rank from August 1, 1864, and the U.S. Senate confirmed the appointment on February 14, 1865.

=== Later in the war ===
After Gettysburg, Webb received command of the division six weeks later and led it through the fall campaigns. His division played a prominent role in the Battle of Bristoe Station.

When Gibbon returned to command in the spring of 1864, Webb went back to brigade command for the Overland Campaign. On May 9, 1864, The New York Times published a false report that Webb had been killed during the first day of the Battle of Wilderness.

Days later, at the Battle of Spotsylvania Court House, Webb was hit by a bullet that passed through the corner of his right eye and came out his ear, but did not impair his mental abilities.

He returned to the army on January 11, 1865, and was chief of staff of the Army of the Potomac from that date until June 28, 1865. Webb was the assistant inspector general of the Military Division of the Atlantic between July 1, 1865, and February 21, 1866. Webb was mustered out of the volunteer force on January 15, 1866.

On April 10, 1866, President Andrew Johnson nominated Webb for appointment to the brevet grade of brigadier general, USA (regular army), to rank from March 13, 1865, and the U.S. Senate confirmed the appointment on May 4, 1866. On December 11, 1866, President Andrew Johnson nominated Webb for appointment to the brevet grade of major general, USA (regular army), to rank from on March 13, 1865, and the U.S. Senate confirmed the appointment February 23, 1867, recalled the confirmation on February 25, 1867, and reconfirmed it on March 2, 1867.

=== Postbellum life ===
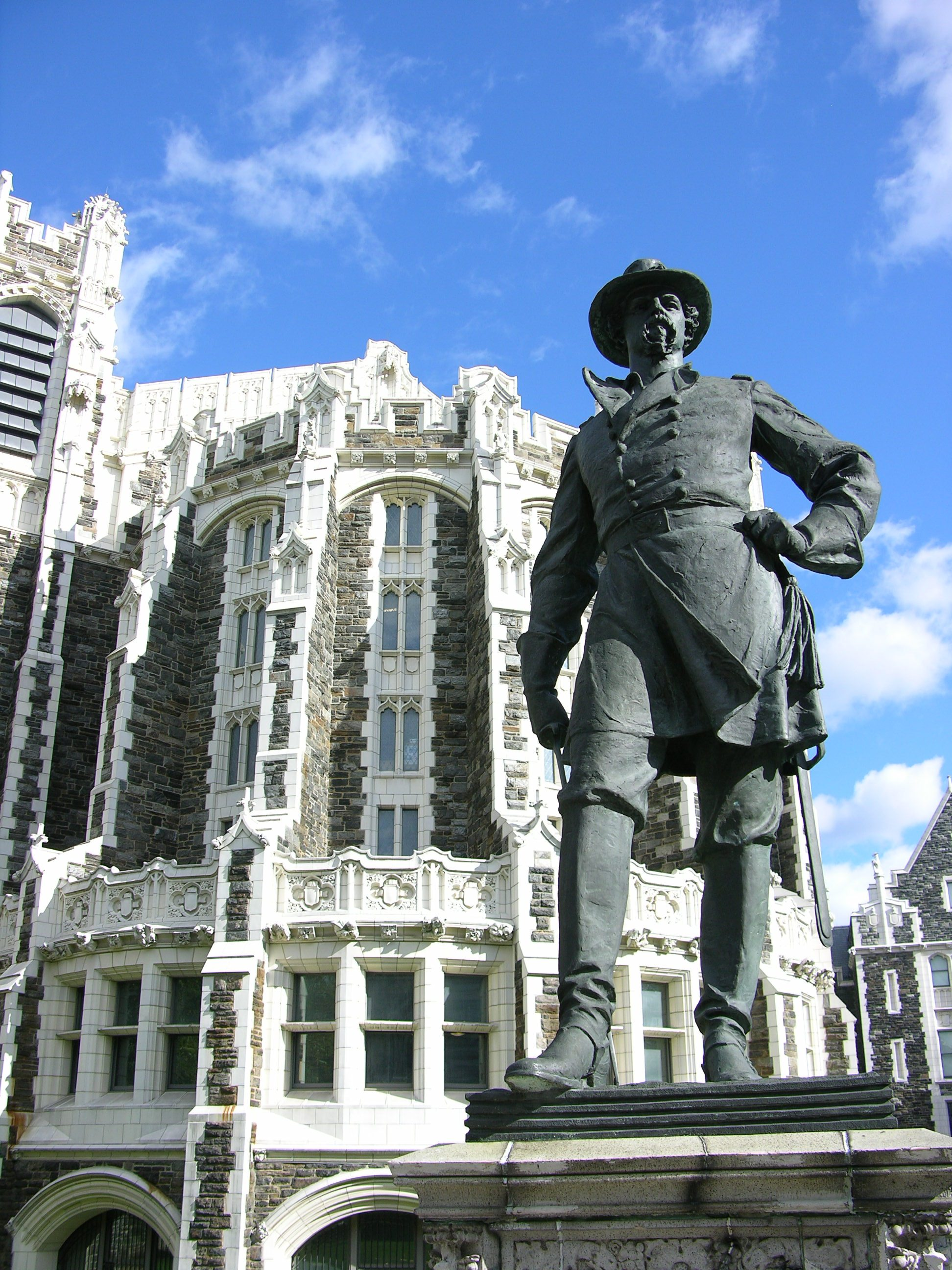
Statue of Alexander S. Webb at City College of New York campus in Harlem, New York City

General Webb stayed with the Army until 1870, assigned as a lieutenant colonel to the 44th U.S. Infantry Regiment, July 28, 1866, and the 5th U.S. Infantry Regiment, March 15, 1869. He became unassigned, March 24, 1869. During his final year, he served again as an instructor at West Point. He was discharged on December 5, 1870, with the final permanent rank of lieutenant colonel.

From 1869 to 1902, General Webb served as the second president of the City College of New York, succeeding Horace Webster, also a West Point graduate. The college's curriculum under Webster and Webb combined classical training in Latin and Greek with more practical subjects like chemistry, physics, and engineering.

General Webb was an early companion of the New York Commandery of the Military Order of the Loyal Legion of the United States, being elected on March 18, 1866. He was a founder and first Commander General of the Military Order of Foreign Wars in 1894. He was also a hereditary member of the New York Society of the Cincinnati and a member of the Society of the Army of the Potomac.

== Personal life ==
On November 28, 1855, Webb was married to Anna Elizabeth Remsen (1837–1912), the daughter of Henry Rutgers Remsen and Elizabeth Waldron (née Phoenix) Remsen. In February 1892, Webb, his wife, and their daughter and son, Caroline and Alexander, were all included in Ward McAllister's "Four Hundred". Together, they were the parents of eight children, including:

- Henry Remsen Webb (1857–1858), who died young.
- Helen Lispenard Webb (1859–1929), who married John Ernest Alexandre (1840–1910), who was involved in steamships, in 1887.
- Elizabeth Remsen Webb (1864–1926), who married George Burrington Parsons (1863–1939), the brother of William Barclay Parsons, in 1891.
- Anne Remsen Webb (1866–1943), who did not marry and lived with her sister Caroline.
- Caroline LeRoy Webb (1868–1950), who did not marry.
- Alexander Stewart Webb Jr. (1870–1948), who married Florence (née Sands) Russell (1871–1941), the widow of architect William Hamilton Russell, in 1916.
- William Remsen Webb (1872–1899), who died unmarried.
- Louise de Peyster Webb (1874–1910), who married William John Wadsworth in 1904.

Webb died in Riverdale, New York on February 12, 1911. He is buried in West Point National Cemetery. A statue of General Webb was dedicated in the Gettysburg National Military Park in 1915.

=== Descendants ===
Through his daughter Helen, he was the grandfather of Marie "Civilise" Alexandre (1891–1967), who married U.S. Olympian Frederic Schenck (1886–1919) in 1917; and Anna Remsen Alexandre (1895–1984).

=== Legacy ===
Webb was an articulate and graphic author who wrote extensively about the Civil War, including his book published in 1881, The Peninsula: McClellan's Campaign of 1862. A full-length bronze statue of him stands at Gettysburg Battlefield, overlooking the approach of Pickett's Charge. A full-length statue of General Webb, in full military uniform, also stands in his honor on the campus of the City College of New York.

Colonel Charles S. Wainwright, chief of artillery of the I Corps, a friend and social peer of Webb in New York City, wrote that he was one of the "most conscientious, hard working and fearless young officers that we have." Meade's aide Theodore Lyman considered him "jolly and pleasant," although he was put off by Webb's "way of suddenly laughing in a convulsive manner, by drawing in his breath, instead of letting it out—the way which goes to my bones." But Lyman regarded Webb as a "thorough soldier, wide-awake, quick, and attentive to detail," despite this annoying quirk.

== In popular culture ==
Civil War historian Brian Pohanka had a brief, uncredited appearance as Webb in the 1993 film Gettysburg, about the battle.

== See also ==
- List of Medal of Honor recipients for the Battle of Gettysburg
- List of American Civil War Medal of Honor recipients: T–Z
- List of American Civil War generals (Union)

== Notes ==
Academic offices
Preceded by Horace Webster	President of City College of New York; 1869 – 1902	Succeeded by John Huston Finley
