= Francis Francis =

Francis Francis may refer to:

- Francis Francis (cricketer) (1852–1926), English cricketer
- Francis Francis (writer) (1822–1886), English writer on angling
- Francis Francis (speedboat pilot) from Pete Bostwick
- Francis Francis (golfer), English amateur golfer

== See also ==
- FrancisFrancis, an Italian espresso machine manufacturer
- Frank Francis (1901–1988), librarian and curator
- Francis (disambiguation)
