= Francis Francis (writer) =

English writer on angling

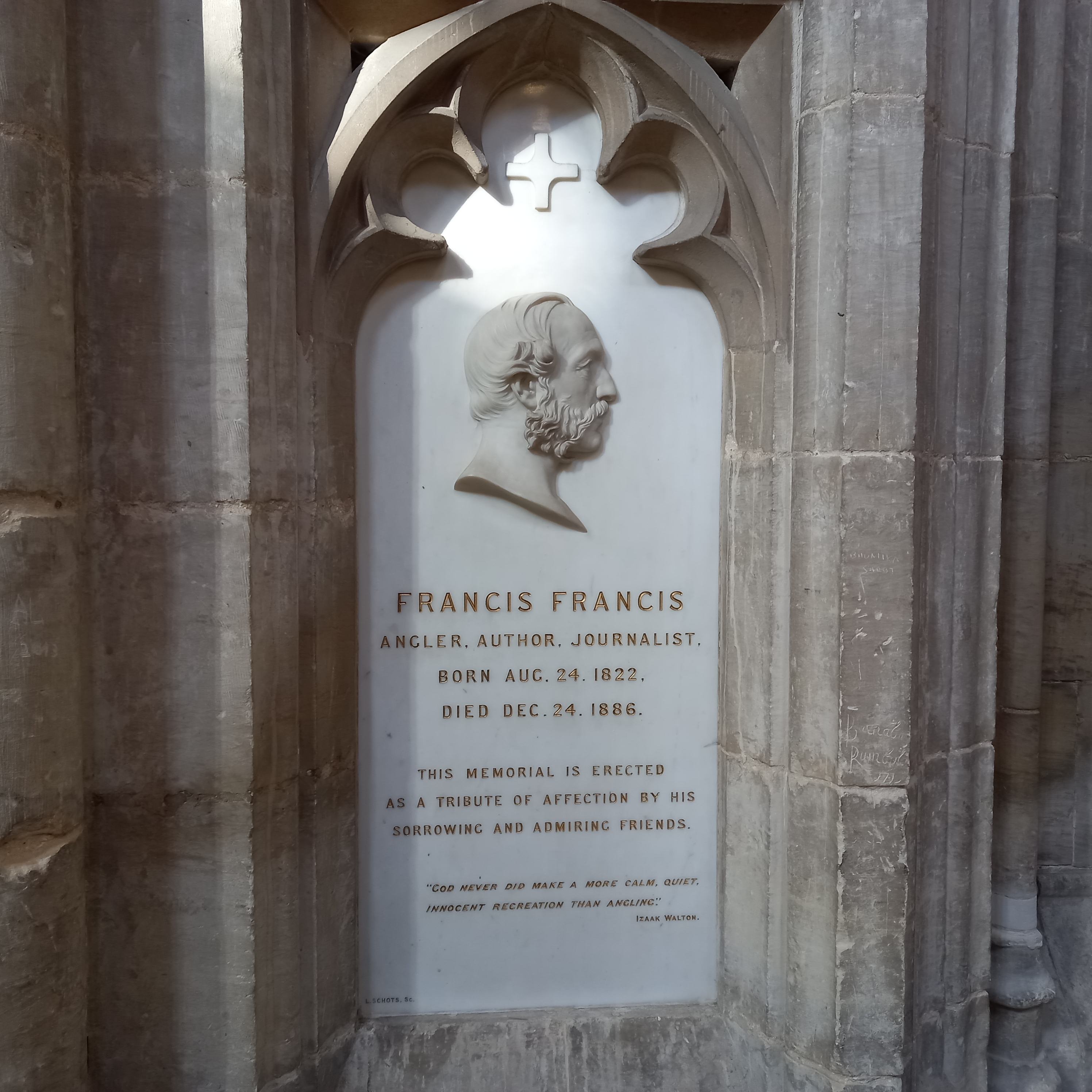
Memorial to Francis Francis in Winchester Cathedral, erected after his death in 1886 by his "sorrowing and admiring friends".

Francis Francis (1822–1886) was an English writer on angling.

== Early life ==
Francis, born at Seaton, Devon, was son of Captain Morgan, R.N.; his mother Sarah was the only daughter of Henry Robinson Hartley who founded the Hartley Institution at Southampton. He changed his name on coming of age and inheriting property. After studying at private schools, and with tutors, he adopted the profession of a civil engineer, but on completing his articles abandoned it for sport and sporting literature.

== Angler ==
In 1851 he married Mary Cole of Oxford, and devoted himself to angling. He was angling editor of The Field for more than a quarter of a century, and frequently wrote about his own experiences. Francis established the Thames Rights Defence Association, throughout life advocated the cause of fish culture, and suggested the plan of the National Fish-Culture Association. He had a large share, too, in introducing English trout to New Zealand and Tasmanian streams.

Francis was a member of the commission on oyster culture from 1868 to 1870. As naturalist director for some years of the Brighton Aquarium he observed fish and made experiments on their culture.

== Later life ==
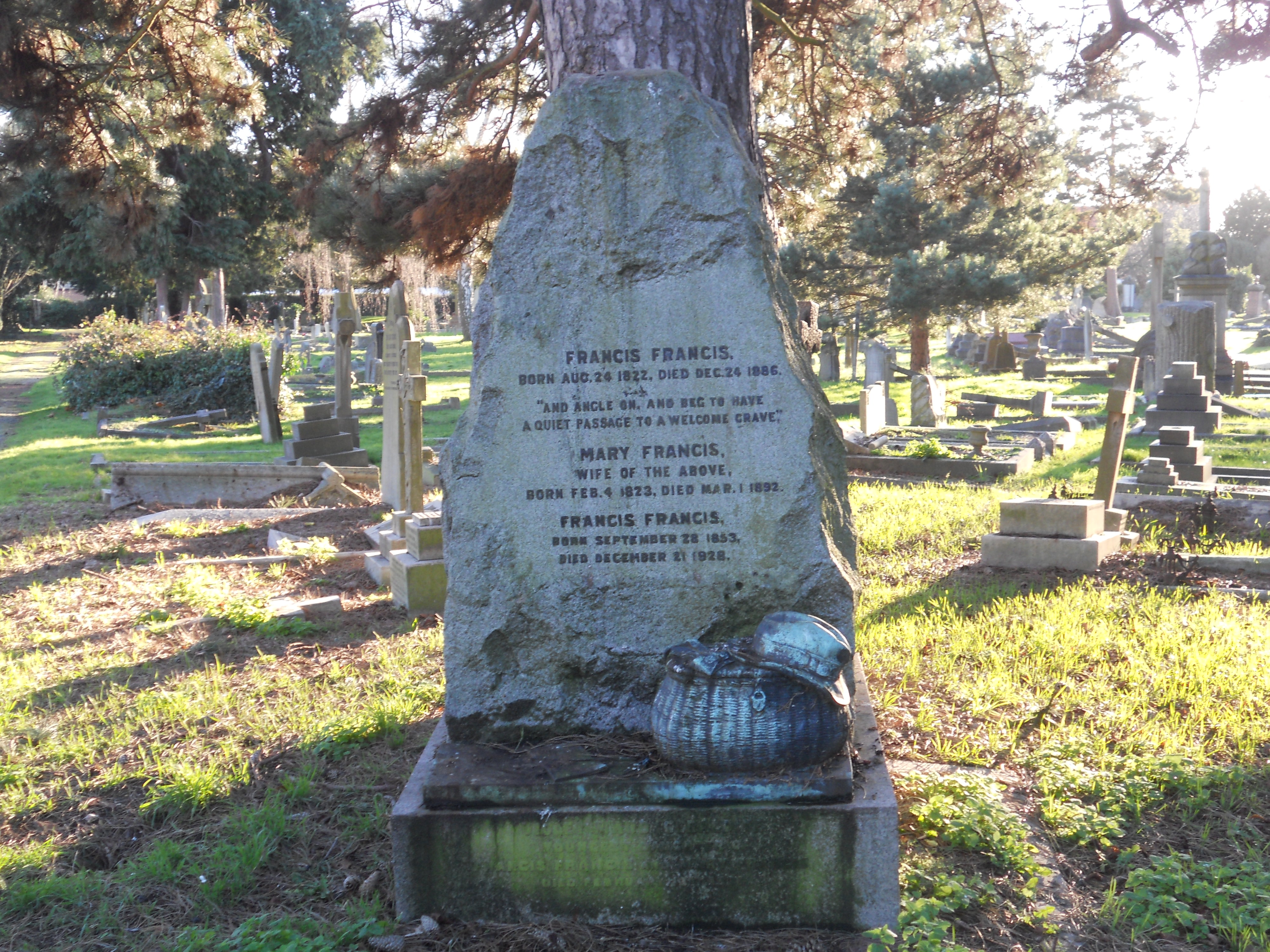
Grave of Francis Francis and family in Twickenham Cemetery

He was seized with a severe stroke of paralysis in 1883. Though he eventually recovered from this, he grew thinner month by month, and an old cancer recurred. He died in his chair on 24 December 1886. He had long lived at Twickenham and was buried there.

The following quotation appears below his name on his gravestone:

And angle on, and beg to have
A quiet passage to a welcome grave.

These are the closings lines to the poem The Angler's Wish by English writer Izaak Walton. A white marble mural monument to Francis was erected in the North Aisle of Winchester Cathedral by his friends, showing a medallion-portrait and another quotation by Walton:

God never did make a more calm, quiet, innocent recreation than angling.

== Works ==
Besides ‘The Diplomatic History of the Greek War’ (1878) which he wrote in early life, Francis was the author of:

- ‘Pickackifax,’ a novel in rhyme, 1854.
- ‘The Real Salt,’ a yachting story, 1854.
- ‘The Angler's Register,’ 1858, 1860, 1861, from which sprang the ‘Angler's Diary.’
- ‘Newton Dogvane,’ a novel, 3 vols., illustrated by John Leech, 1859.
- ‘Fish Culture,’ 1863.
- ‘A Book on Angling,’ 1867, his best work, which has often been enlarged and reissued in subsequent years.
- ‘Sidney Bellew,’ a sporting novel, 2 vols., 1870.
- ‘Reports on Salmon Ladders,’ 1870.
- ‘By Lake and River,’ rambles in the north of England and in Scotland.
- ‘Angling’ (often reissued), 1877.
- ‘Sporting Sketches with Pen and Pencil,’ 1878 (in conjunction with A. W. Cooper).
- ‘Miscellaneous Papers from the "Field,"’ 1880.
- War, Waves, and Wanderings: A Cruise in the ‘Lancashire Witch’, 1881.
- ‘The Practical Management of Fisheries,’ 1883.
- ‘Angling Reminiscences,’ a posthumous work, 1887, containing almost his last contributions to the Field paper.

He wrote the articles on angling in Chambers's Encyclopædia, and contributed to other magazines and journals.
