= Ernst Roth =

Austrian-British music publisher

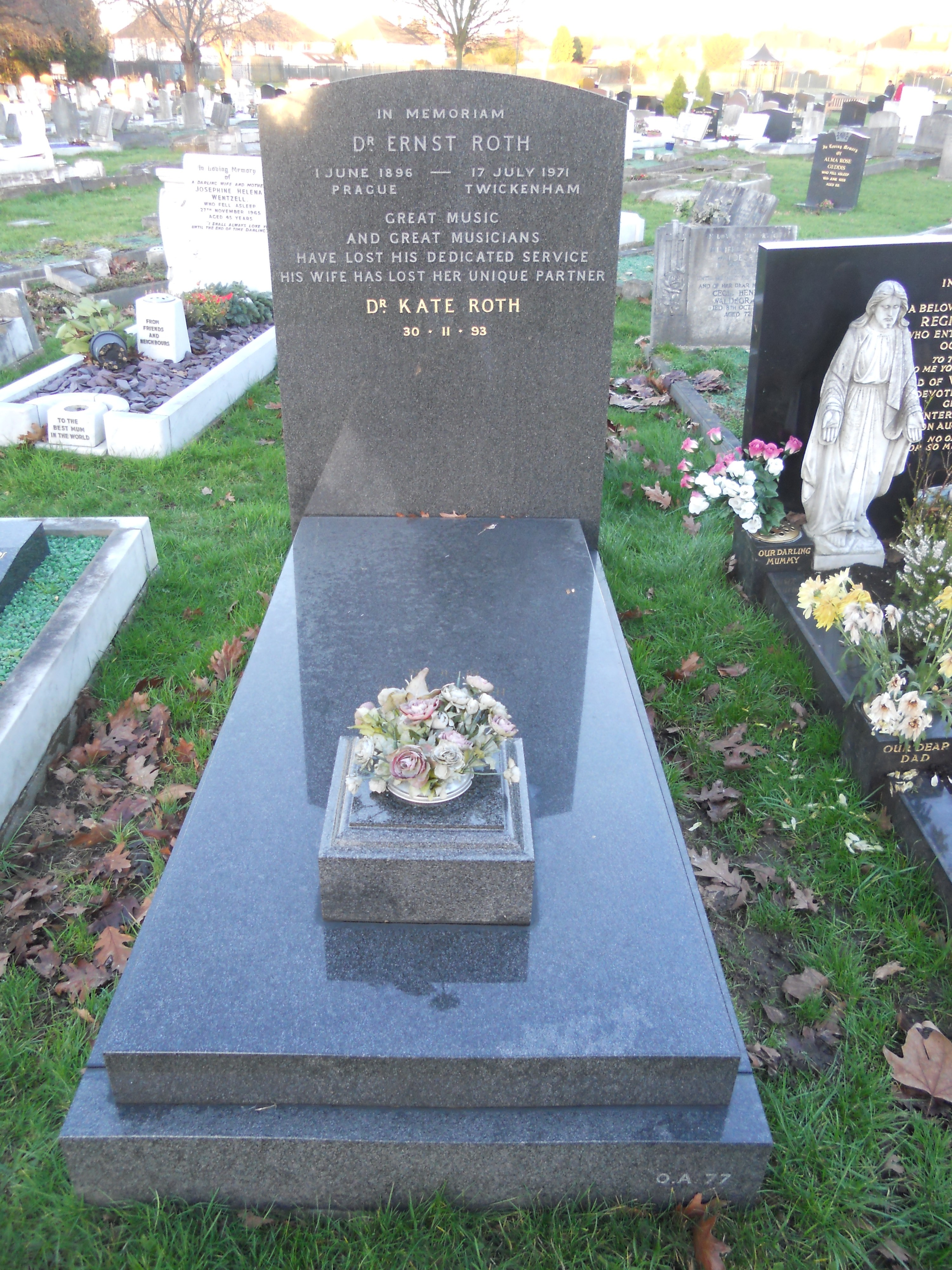
- His grave, inscription: "Great music and great musicians have lost his dedicated service"
- Born: 1 June 1896; Prague, Austria-Hungary
- Died: 17 July 1971 (aged 75); Twickenham, England
- Resting place: Twickenham Cemetery, London
- Education: Charles University in Prague
- Occupation: Music publisher
- Years active: 1920s–1971
- Employers: Wiener Philharmonischer Verlag; Universal Edition; Boosey & Hawkes

Ernst Roth (1 June 1896 – 17 July 1971) was a music publisher for Universal Edition in Vienna and Boosey & Hawkes in London, and became the company's director in 1968. He also wrote about music and translated.

== Career ==
Roth was born in Prague, then part of the Austro-Hungarian Empire, into a Jewish family from Bohemia. He received his first piano instructions at age five. His first language was Czech but his education, from kindergarten to university, was in German. Starting in 1915 he studied law, philosophy and music theory at the Karls-Universität Prag (the German branch of the Charles University in Prague). He was promoted in law in 1921 and continued studies of musicology in Vienna with Guido Adler. After military service in World War I, he was, from the early 1920s, publisher of the Wiener Philharmonischer Verlag. The publishing house was acquired by Universal Edition (UE) in 1925, and Roth worked for UE from 1927, focusing on new editions of the piano works by Mozart, Schubert, Schumann and Brahms. He also wrote more than one hundred articles and three novels.

The 1938 annexation of Austria by Nazi Germany gave rise to institutionalized, violent anti-Semitism, and so he emigrated in 1938 to London, where he worked for Boosey & Hawkes. His work was interrupted in 1940 when he was interned in Huyton, Merseyside. Due to intervention by composer Ralph Vaughan Williams, he was released after four months. For Boosey and Hawkes, he made piano reductions of works by composers such as Bach, Beethoven and Mozart. He translated operas and choral works to German, including compositions by Henry Barraud, Benjamin Britten, Alberto Ginastera, Zoltán Kodály, Bohuslav Martinů, Igor Stravinsky, Alexander Tcherepnin and William Walton. Besides Kodály and Stravinsky, Roth especially promoted the composers Béla Bartók and Richard Strauss. In January 1943 he acquired the rights to the works by Strauss, which were held by Adolph Fürstner in Berlin, and in 1946 he organised a Richard Strauss-Festival against opposition because of the composer's political position. From 1949 to 1964, Roth was general manager of Boosey & Hawkes and held leading positions until his death. Roth was instrumental in publishing Four Last Songs by Strauss in 1950 after the composer's death, in the order that most performances now follow.

From 1959 Roth was vice president of the music section of the International Publishers Association. He died in 1971 in Twickenham and was buried in Twickenham Cemetery, London. The inscription reads: "Great music and great musicians have lost his dedicated service".

== Selected works ==
- Die Grenzen der Künste, Stuttgart: Engelhorn, 1925.
- Eine Wallfahrt zu Mozart – Die Reisetagebücher von Vincent und Mary Novello aus dem Jahre 1829, translation by Roth, Bonn: Boosey & Hawkes, 1959.
- European Music. A Short History, London: Boosey & Hawkes, 1961.
- Vom Vergänglichen in der Musik, Zürich: Atlantis, 1949.
- Musik als Kunst und Ware, Zürich: Atlantis, 1966.
