= Twickenham Cemetery =

Cemetery in Hounslow, Greater London

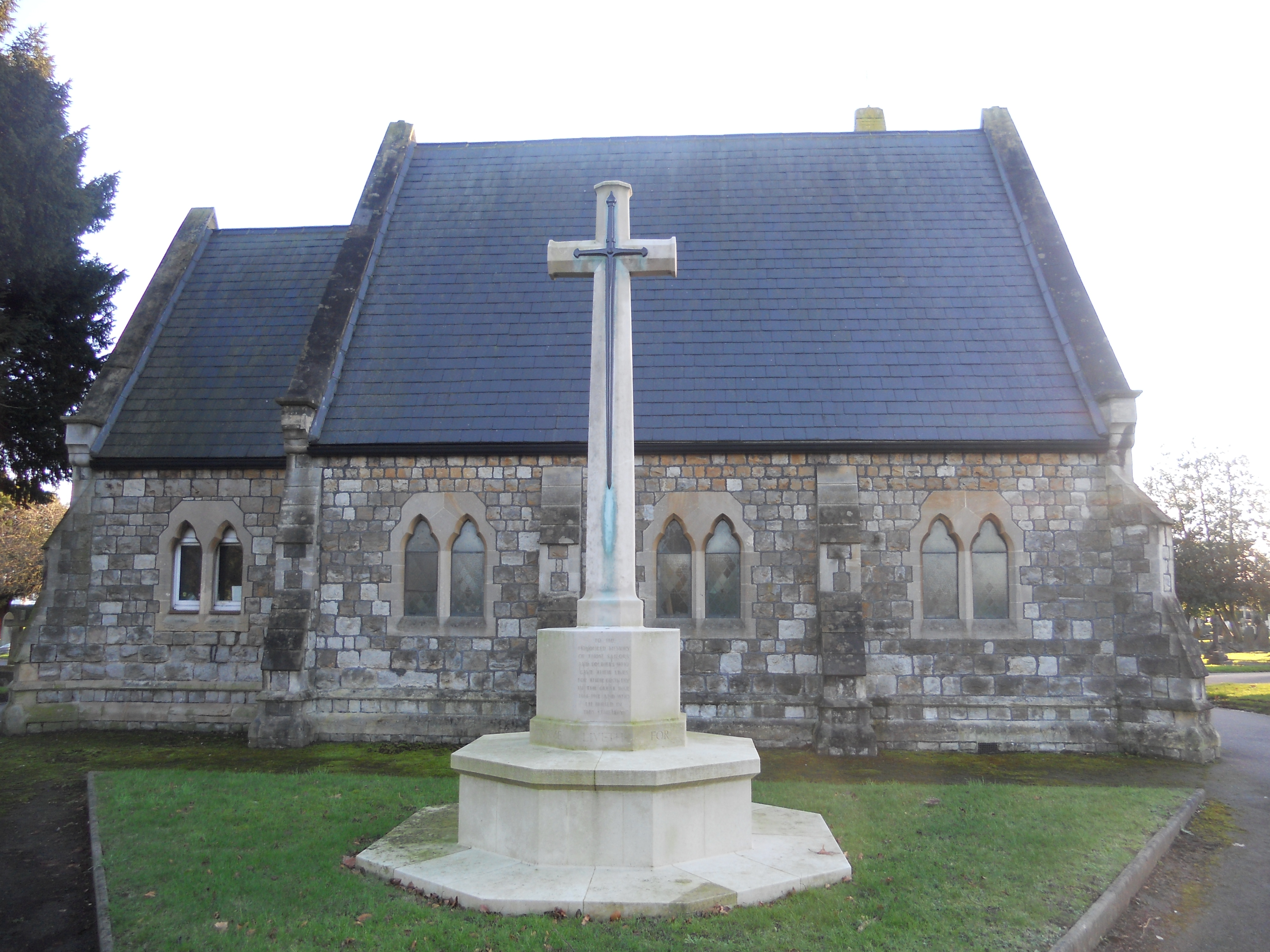
- Cross of Sacrifice in Twickenham Cemetery
- Interactive map of Twickenham Cemetery

Details
- Established: 1868; 158 years ago
- Location: Whitton, London Borough of Richmond upon Thames
- Country: England
- Coordinates: 51.446°N 0.364°W
- Type: Active
- Owned by: Richmond upon Thames Council

Twickenham Cemetery is a cemetery at Hospital Bridge Road, Whitton in the London Borough of Richmond upon Thames. It was established in 1868 and was expanded in the 1880s, when the local parish churchyards were closed to new burials.

== Notable burials ==
- Hylda Baker (d. 1986), comedienne, actress and music hall performer
- Herbert Mills Birdwood (d. 1907), British Indian judge and civil servant, naturalist and botanist
- William Birdwood, 1st Baron Birdwood (d. 1951), who commanded the ANZAC forces during the Gallipoli Campaign in 1915 and became Commander-in-Chief, India in 1925
- Frederick James Camm (d. 1959), technical author and magazine editor
- "Fast Eddie" Clarke (d. 2018), rock musician
- Leonard N. Fowles (d. 1939), organist, choirmaster and composer, best remembered for his hymn tunes "Golders Green" and "Phoenix"
- Francis Francis (d. 1886), angler and novelist
- Edward Stanley Gibbons (d. 1913), stamp dealer and founder of Stanley Gibbons Ltd, publishers of the Stanley Gibbons stamp catalogue
- Joseph Jackson Howard (d. 1902), genealogist, and Maltravers Herald of Arms Extraordinary 1887–1902
- Norman Cyril Jackson (d. 1994), recipient of the Victoria Cross
- Leonard Jack Lewis (d. 2005), television director
- Laurence Oliphant (d. 1888), author, traveller, diplomat and Christian mystic
- Jonathan Peel (d. 1879), Secretary of State for War
- Erich Redman (d. 2025), actor
- Ernst Roth (d. 1971), music publisher
- Elizabeth Twining (d. 1889), English painter, author, and botanical illustrator
- Herbert Edgar Weston (d. 1961), stamp dealer
- William Kennedy Laurie Dickson (d. 1935), inventor. The grave was discovered by Denis Zanette in 2026, following research.

== Gallery ==
Graves at Twickenham Cemetery
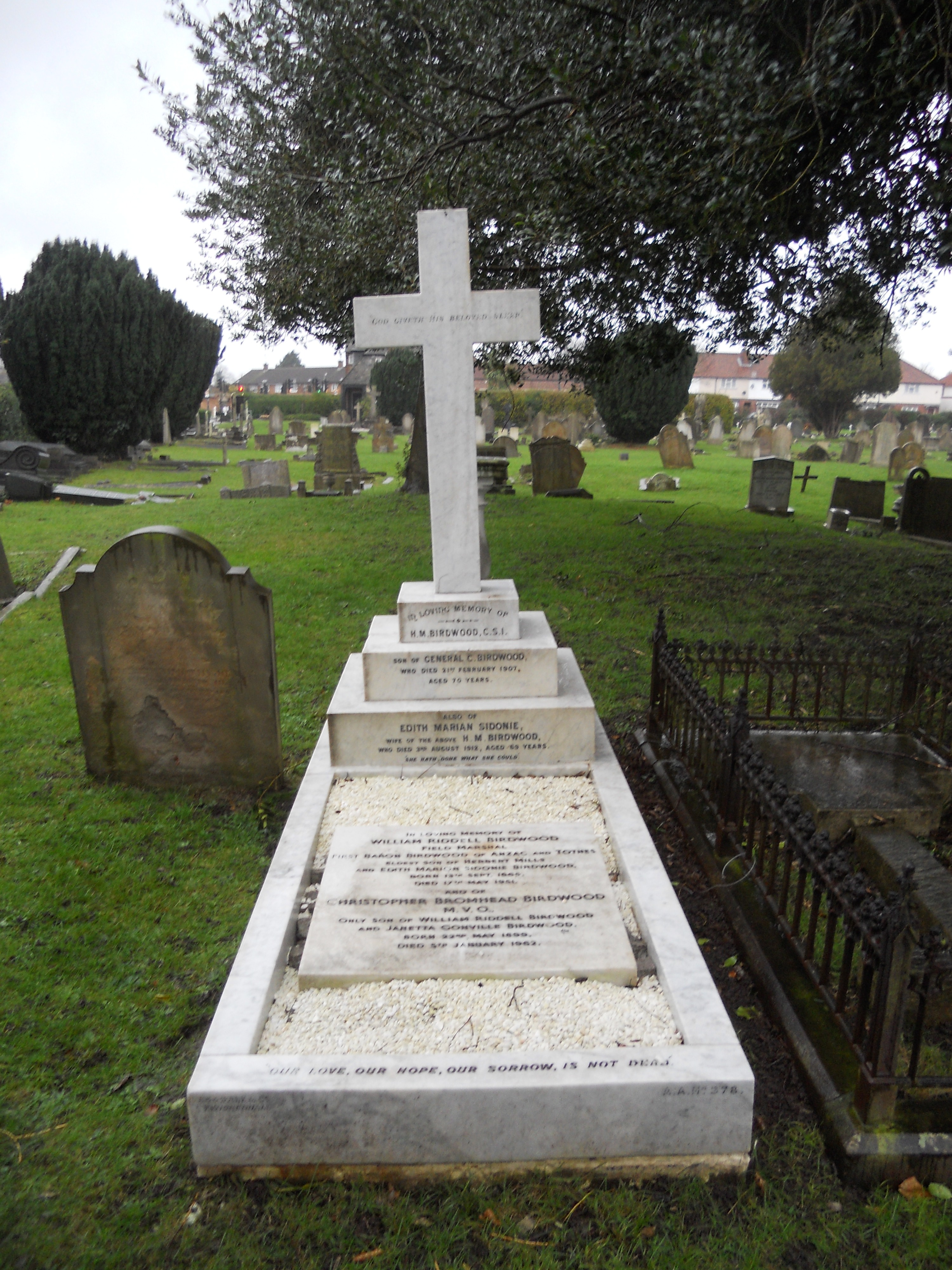
William Birdwood and family

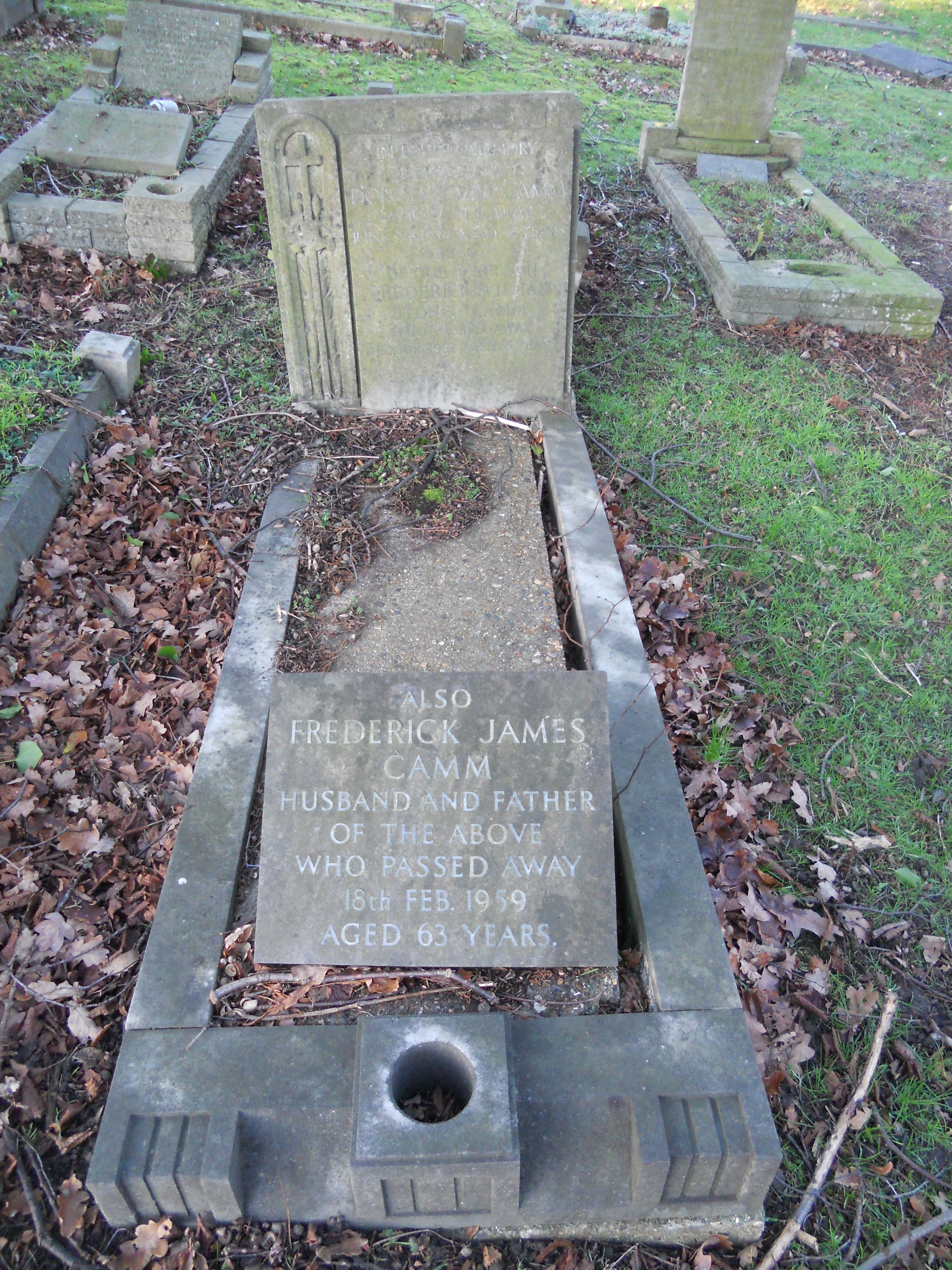
Frederick James Camm

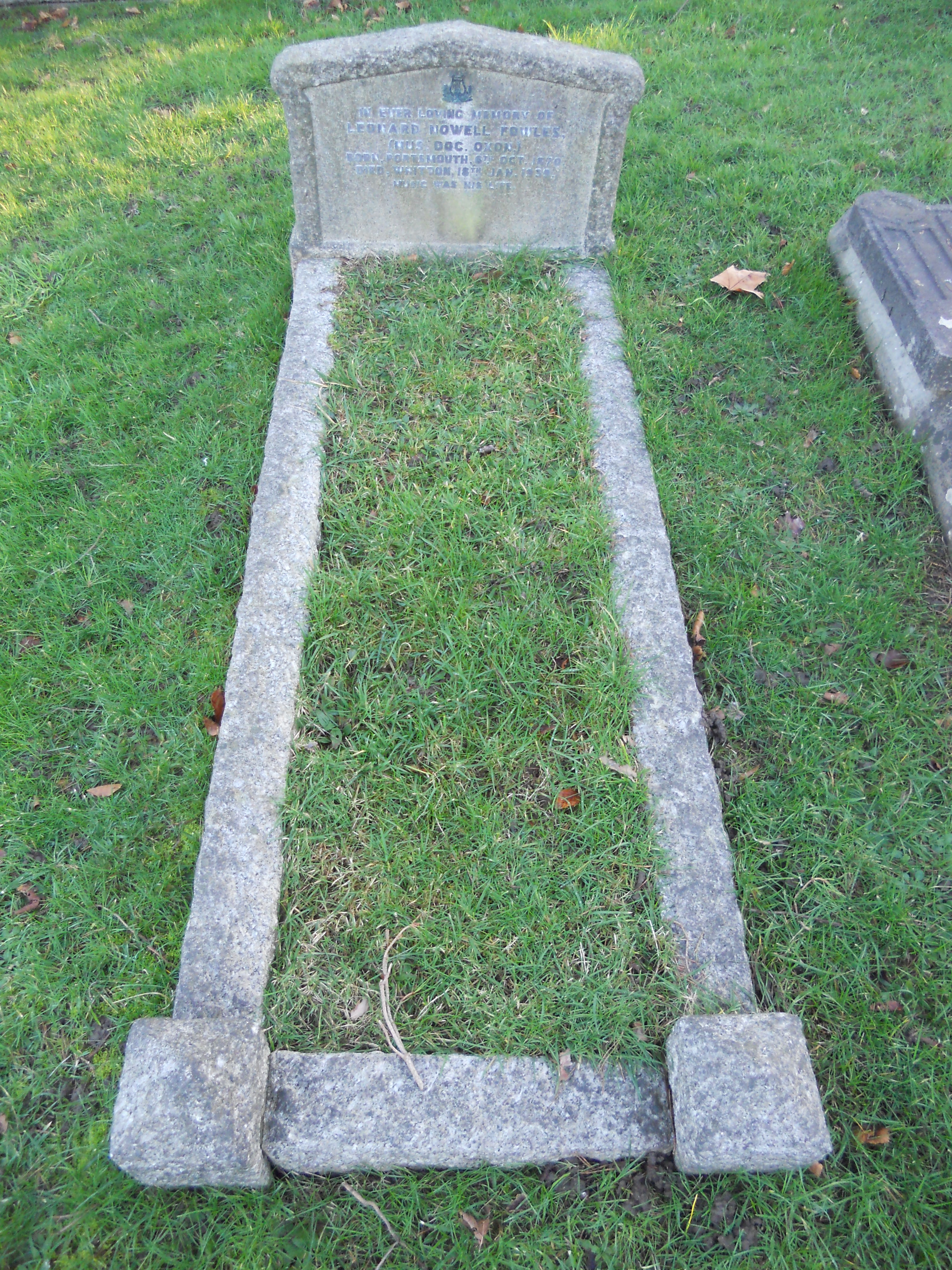
Leonard N. Fowles

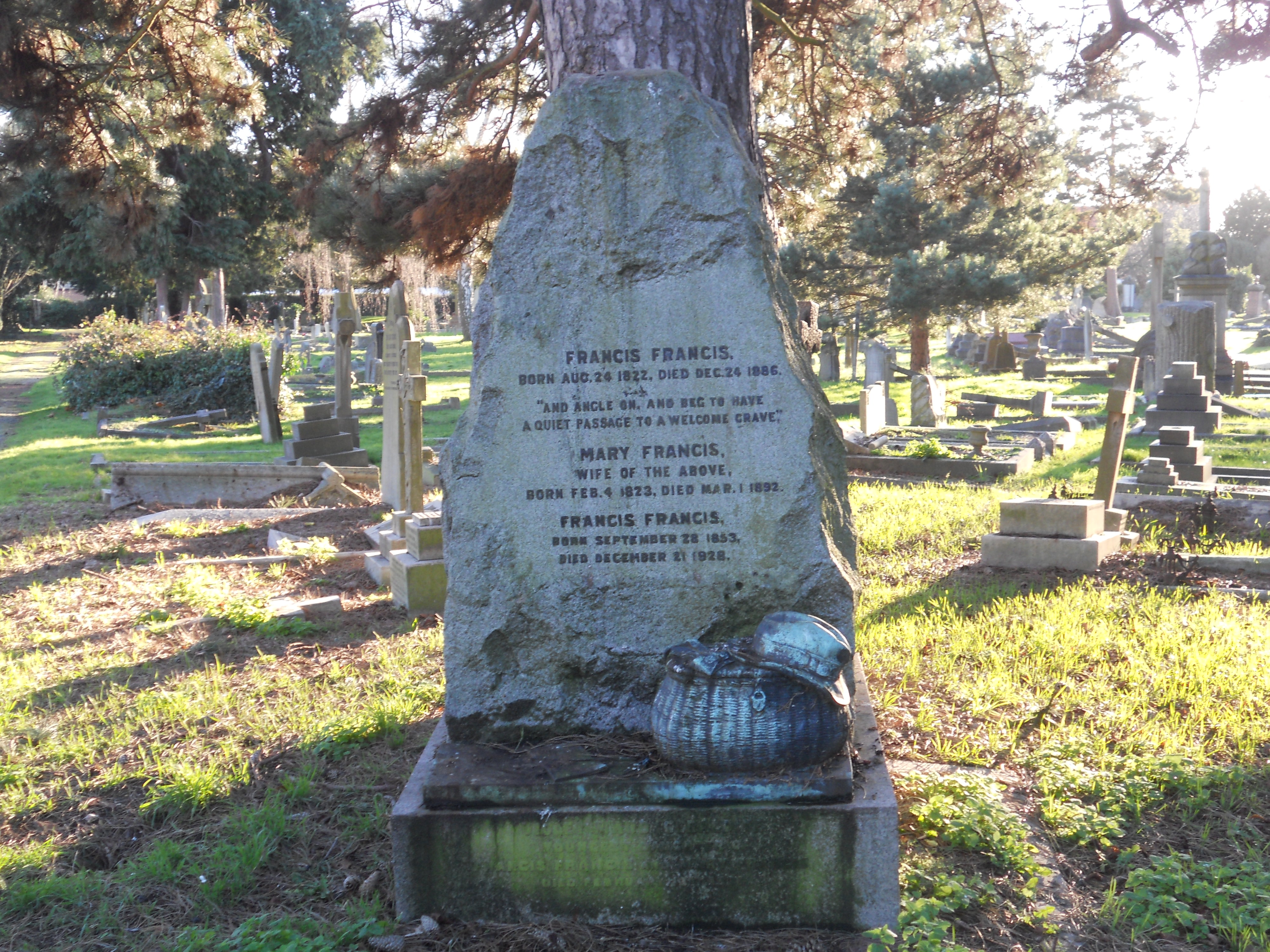
Francis Francis

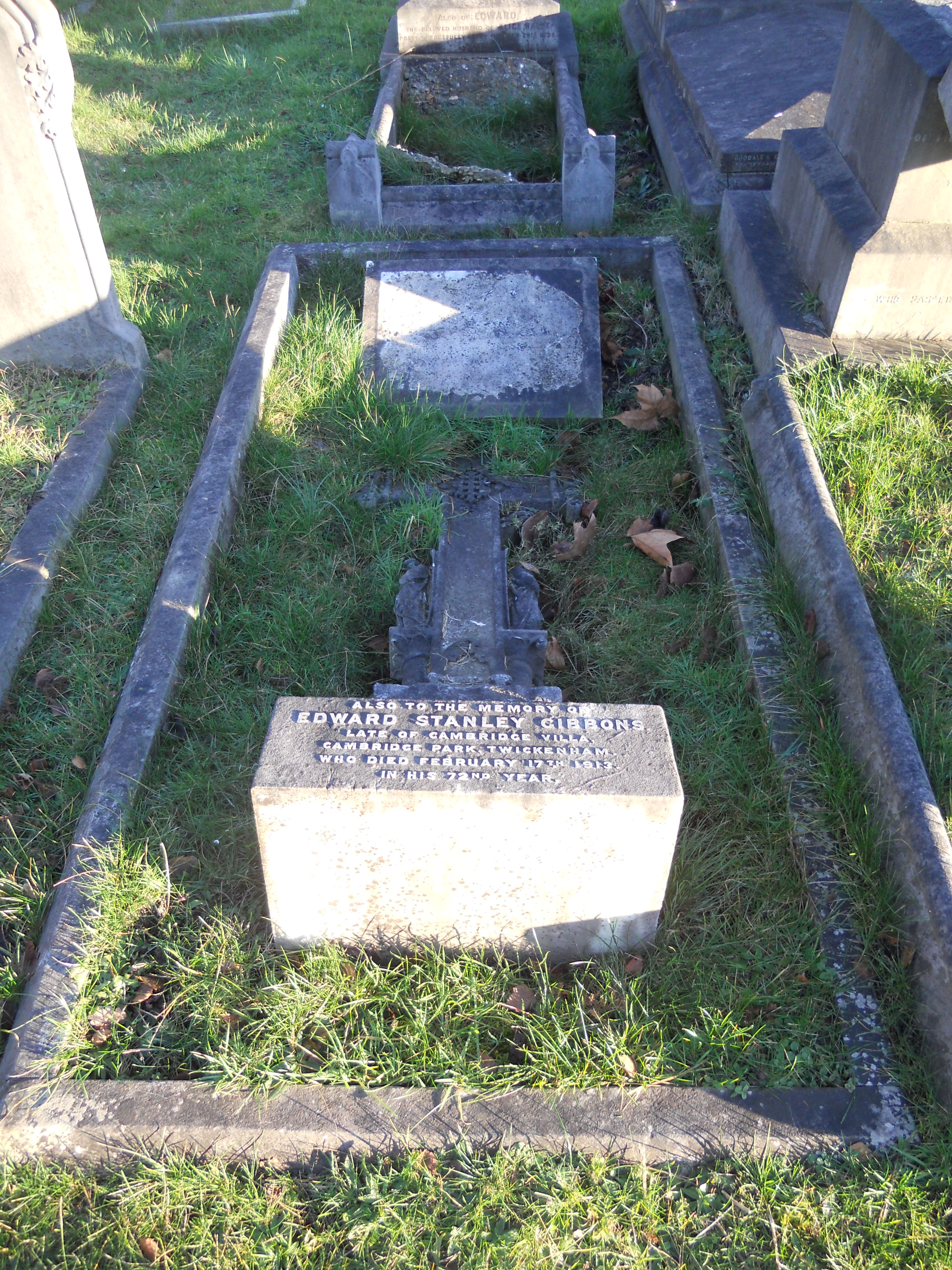
Edward Stanley Gibbons

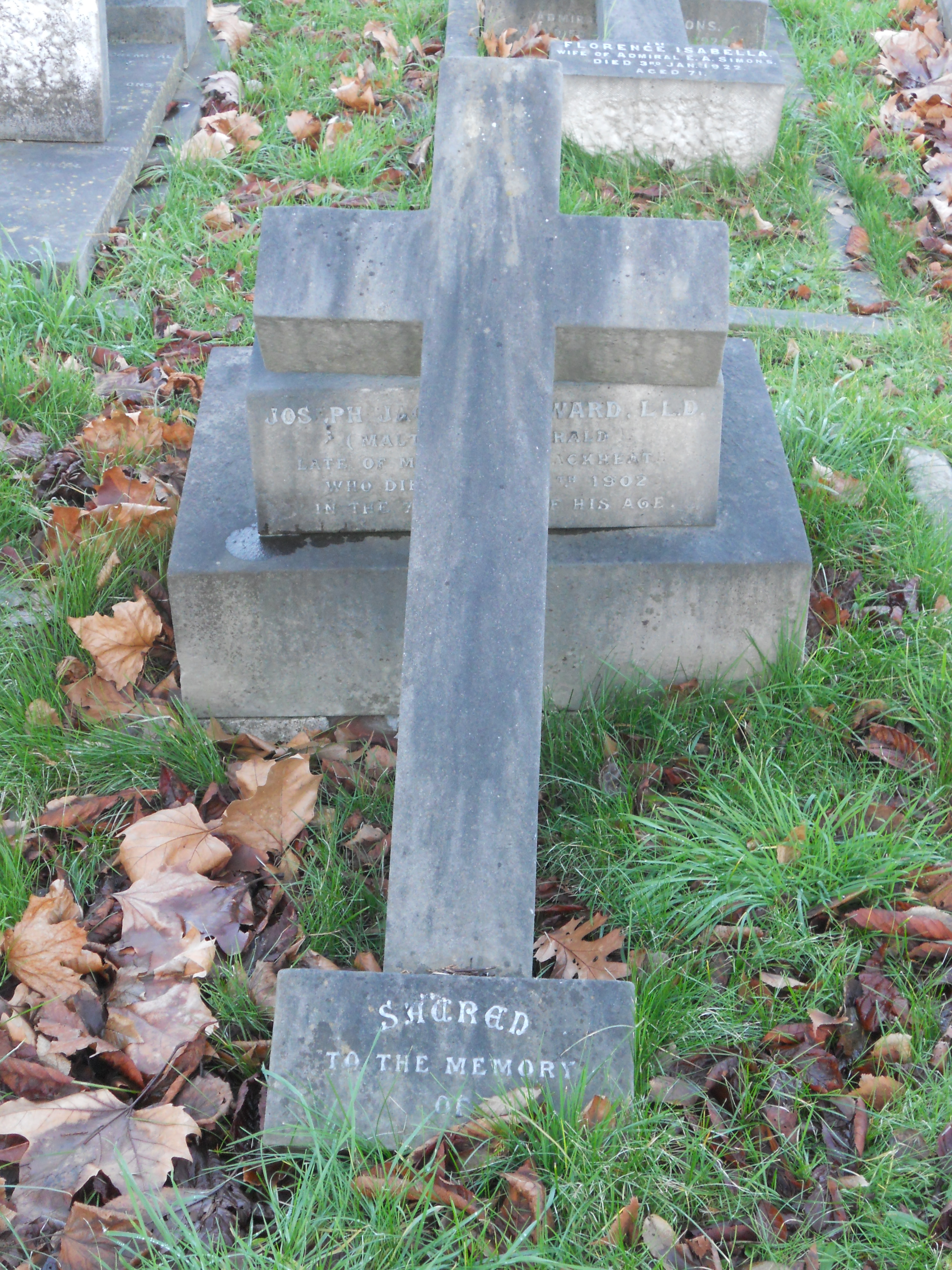
Joseph Jackson Howard

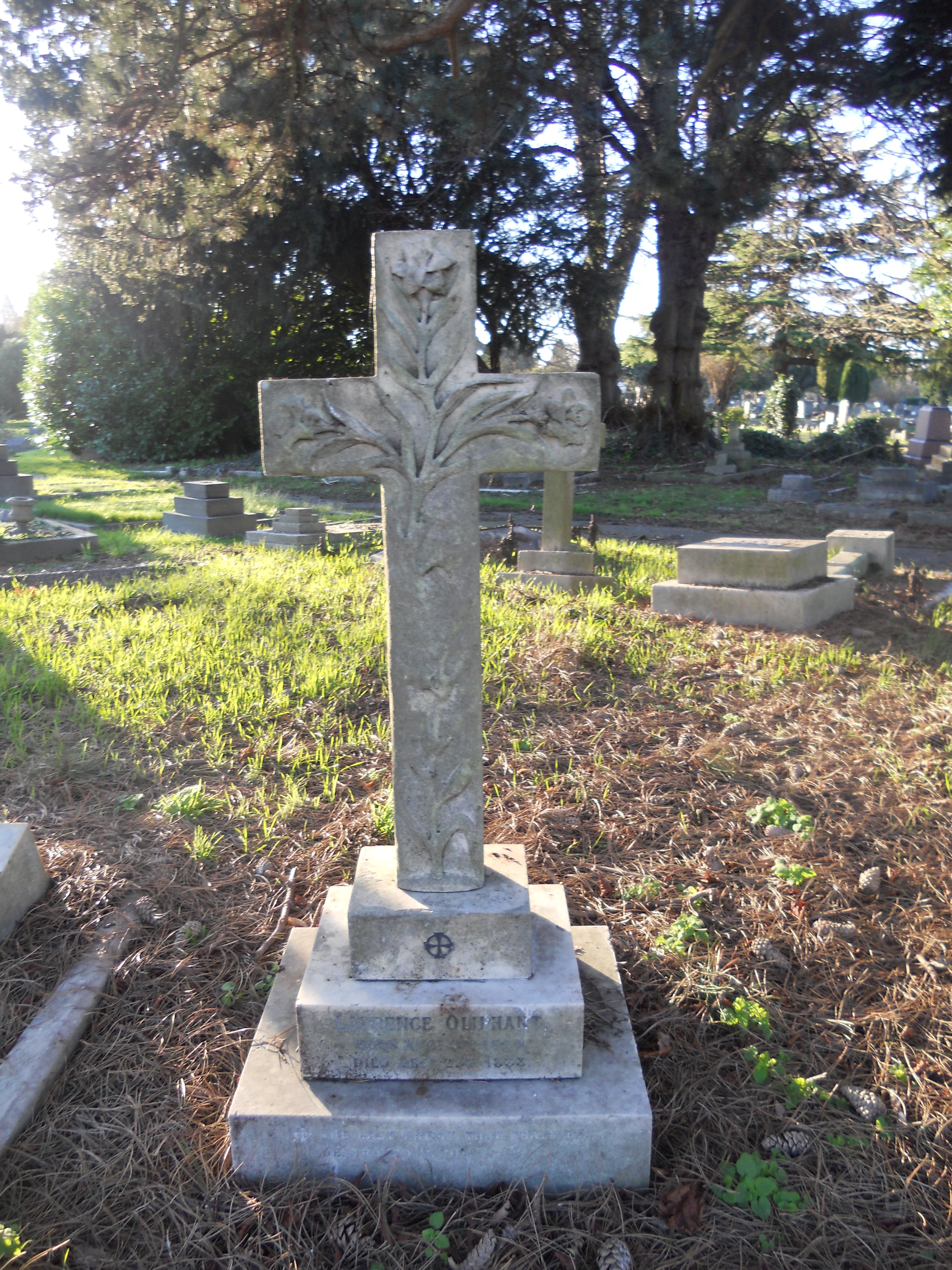
Laurence Oliphant

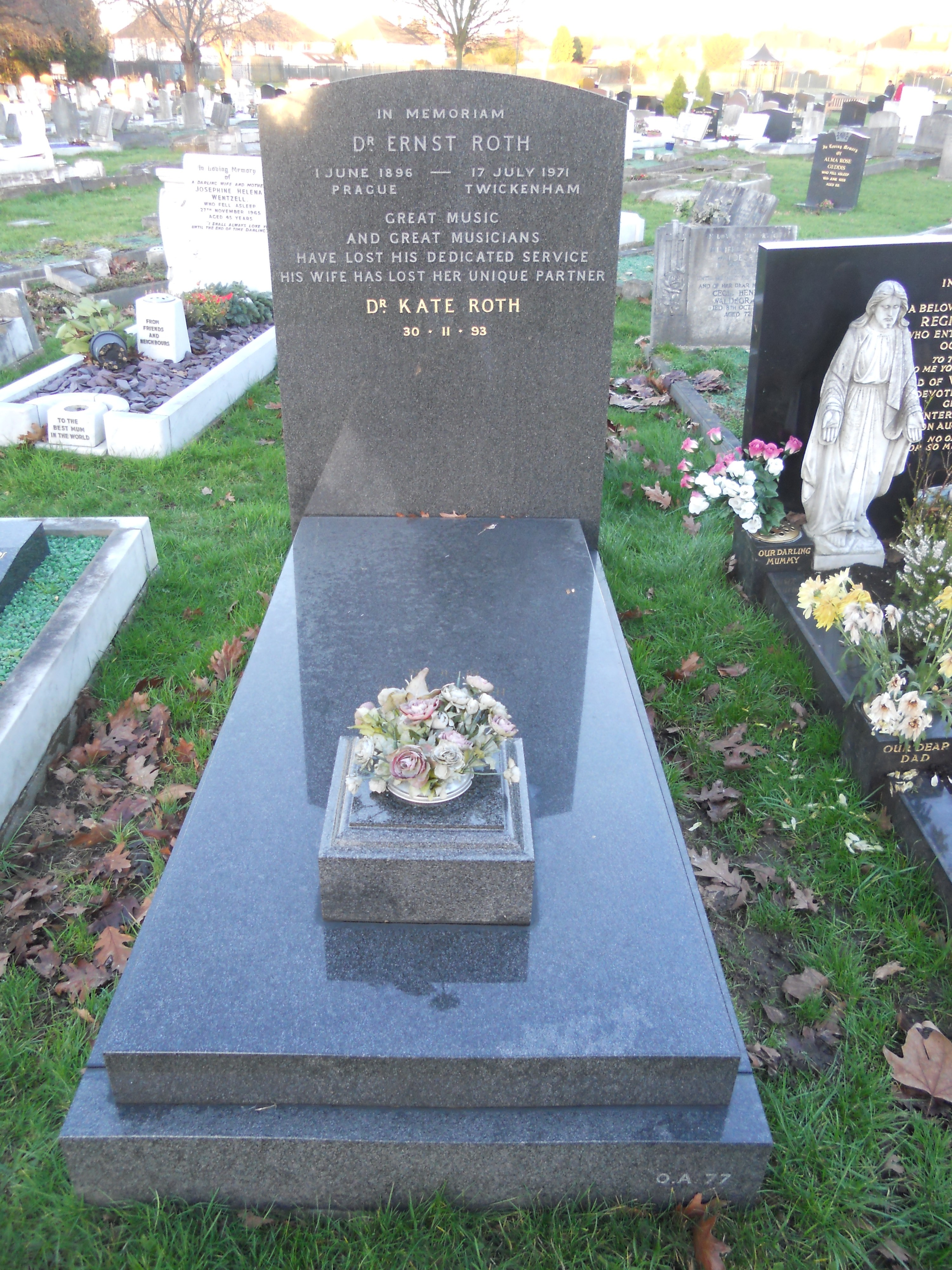
Ernst Roth

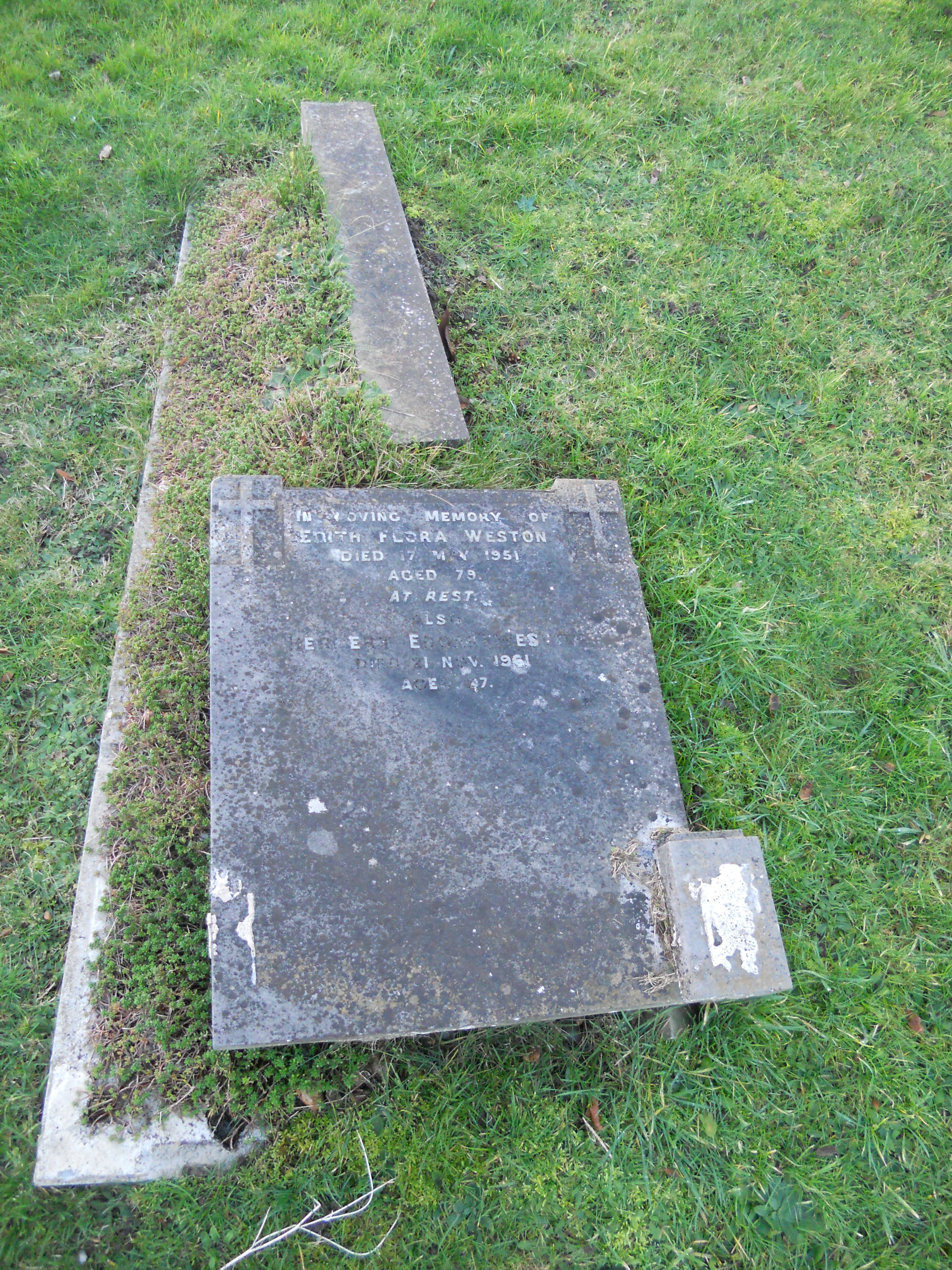
Herbert Edgar Weston and his wife

Grave of William Kennedy Laurie Dickson and his wife
