= Leonard N. Fowles =

English musician

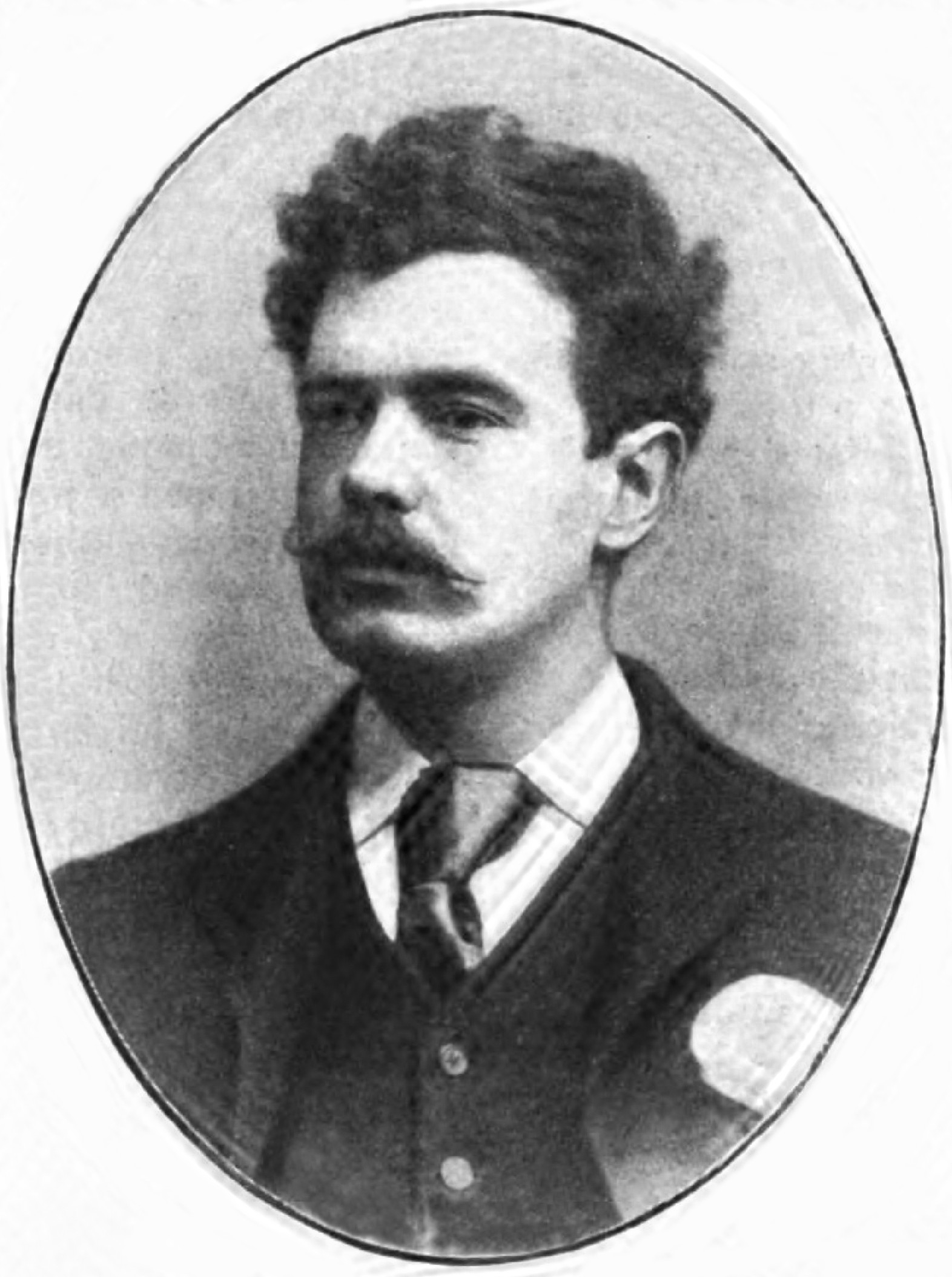
Leonard Fowles, 1904

Leonard Nowell Fowles (6 October 1870 – 18 January 1939) was an English organist and choirmaster, classical music composer, arranger, teacher, adjudicator and conductor, best remembered for his hymn tunes "Golders Green" and "Phoenix".

== Early years and education ==
Fowles was born on 6 October 1870, at Portsea Island near Southsea, Hampshire, to Helen Nowell and Albert Godwin Fowles. His father, a native of the Isle of Wight, was a highly regarded professor of music and a free church organist; his mother was born on Jersey, the Channel Islands. His was a musical family. Fowles' paternal aunt, Miss Margaret Fowles, was organist and choir director at the important post of St. Michael’s Church, Hyde, the Isle of Wight, and thereafter served as the conductor of the Letchworth Orchestral Society, Letchworth Garden City. His younger brother Bernard Fowles was also a noted musician.

Fowles was raised in comfortable circumstances. Having mastered the keyboard and the violin, at the age of fourteen Fowles went to study at the Brussels Conservatory. In 1887, he was awarded the Whitcomb Scholarship for solo violin at the Royal College of Music. He studied at Oxford in the years 1896-1899. In November 1899 Fowles became the youngest Doctor of Music in the United Kingdom.

== Musical career ==
In 1896 Fowles became the organist and choirmaster of St George’s Presbyterian Church of West Croydon, a post which he held until 1904 when he was invited to serve as the organist and choir director of the Presbyterian Church in St. John's Wood, London. Fowles served as president of the Free Church Musician's Union in 1917, and as an examiner in the London College of Music from 1908 through 1920.

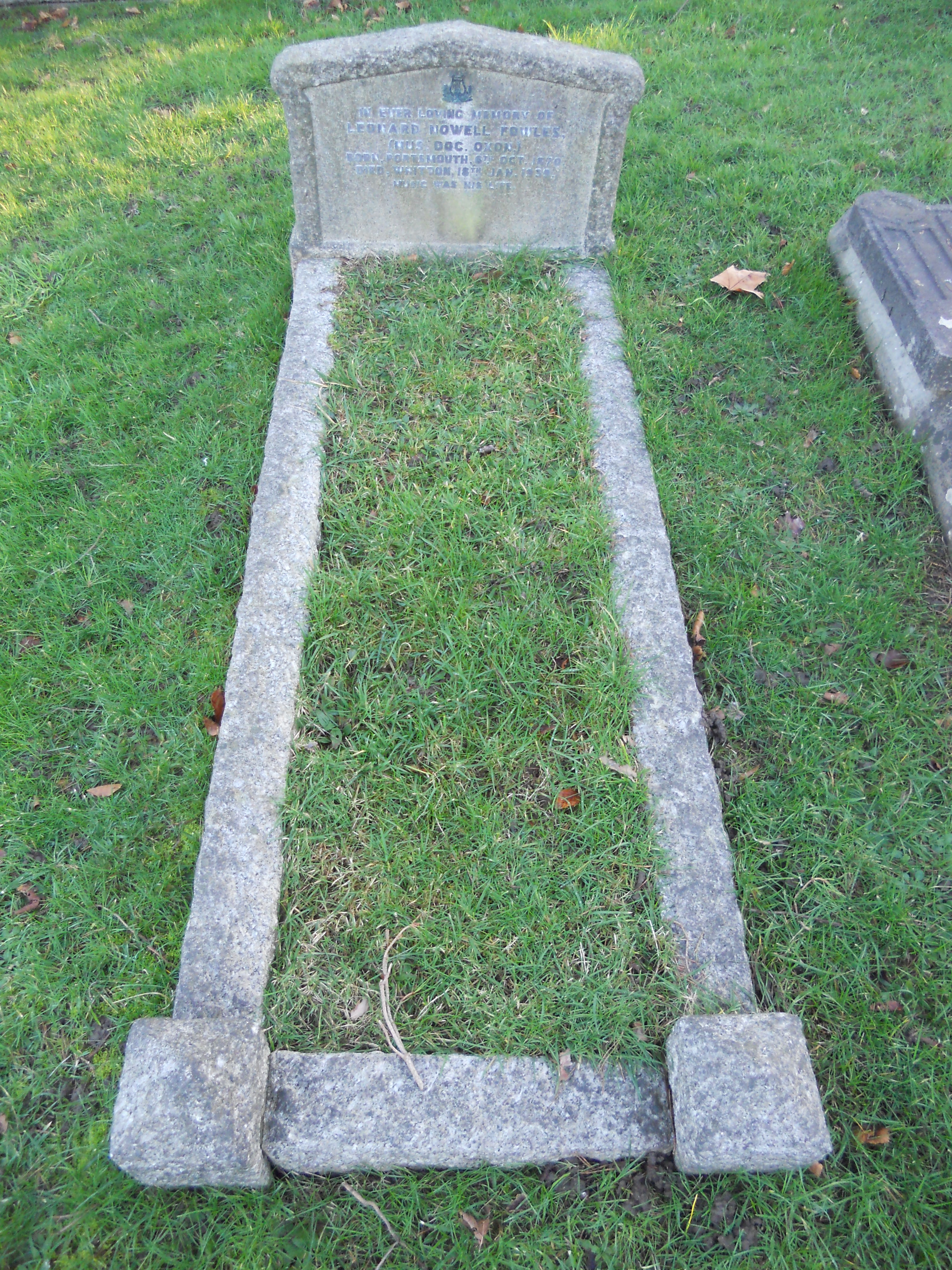
Grave of Fowles in Twickenham Cemetery in 2014

In September 1899, Fowles was married to the former Ethel Hattie Phillips. He died on 18 January 1939 and was buried 24 January 1939, in Twickenham Cemetery, Richmond, London, Section, G. Grave, 151 fourth row. The epitaph on his gravestone states, "Music was his life".

== Selected works ==
- Phoenix (C.M.D.)
- Golders Green (10.10.10.10.)
- Viola sonata (with piano) in B♭ (No. 2)
- Calvary (A Cantata)
- "A Short Litany of Intercession for our Soldiers and Sailors" with words by J. J. Priestley. Publisher: G. Schirmer (London). Published in 1915.
- College Minuet: (Madame de Beaufort)
- "Romany Rye" Copyright 1935
- 2 Sketches for the Organ (Intermezzo and Serenata) (copyright 1914 by Weekes of London)
- "A Memory" for violin and piano (©1913) or for organ (©1917)
