= Norman Cyril Jackson =

Recipient of the Victoria Cross

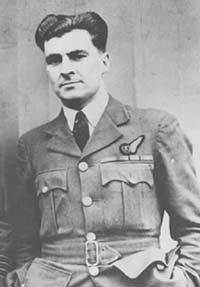
- Norman Jackson c. 1945
- Born: 8 April 1919; Ealing, Middlesex
- Died: 26 March 1994 (aged 74); Hampton Hill, London
- Burial place: Twickenham Cemetery
- Military career
- Allegiance: United Kingdom
- Branch: Royal Air Force
- Service years: 1939–45
- Rank: Warrant officer
- Unit: No. 106 Squadron RAF
- Conflicts: Second World War
- Awards: Victoria Cross

Jackson's medal group with Victoria Cross on display at the Imperial War Museum, London, in 2023

Norman Cyril Jackson VC (8 April 1919 – 26 March 1994) was a sergeant in the Royal Air Force (RAF) who earned the Victoria Cross during a Second World War bombing raid on Schweinfurt, Germany in April 1944.

== Early life ==
Born in Ealing, Middlesex, Jackson was adopted as a one-week-old baby by Mr. and Mrs. Edwin Gunter. The Gunters also adopted Geoffrey Oliver Hartley, who in 1951 was awarded the George Medal as a Federation of Malaya police lieutenant for protecting his party, which included three children, from bandits. (Note: Newspaper reports, including Jackson's obituary in the Daily Telegraph say that Hartley won the George Cross, but the London Gazette, which is the authoritative historical record for British awards, lists his award as the lesser George Medal.) Upon this occasion, Mrs. Gunter said, "We adopted two of the finest sons any parents could wish for."

Jackson qualified as a machinist and turner. Although he was married and in a reserved occupation at the outbreak of the Second World War, he enlisted in the RAF.

== Military career ==
He joined the RAF Volunteer Reserve in 1939 and originally served as a Classified Fitter IIE (engines). In January 1941, he was assigned to a Short Sunderland flying boat squadron based in Freetown, Sierra Leone. He applied for retraining as a flight engineer and returned to England in September 1942.

On 28 July 1943, he joined No. 106 Squadron RAF which operated Avro Lancaster bombers. Jackson completed his tour of duty (30 missions) on 24 April 1944, but, as he had flown one sortie with a different crew, he chose to fly once more so that he and his original aircrew could finish their tours together. Jackson's 31st mission was a raid on the German ball bearing factories at Schweinfurt on the night of 26–27 April.

Having bombed the target, Jackson's Lancaster (serial ME669) was attacked by a German night fighter and the starboard wing caught fire near to a fuel tank. Jackson, already wounded from shell splinters, strapped on a parachute and equipped himself with a fire extinguisher before climbing out of the aircraft and onto the wing, whilst the aeroplane was flying at 200 miles per hour (320 km/h), in order to put out the fire. He gripped the air intake on the leading edge of the wing with one hand, and fought the fire with the other, although he quickly lost the extinguisher. The flames seared his hands, face, and clothes. The fighter returned and hit the bomber with a burst of gunfire that wounded him further, causing him to lose his grip and fall from the wing.

He fell 20,000 feet (6,100 m), but his smouldering and holed parachute worked well enough to save his life. He suffered further injuries upon landing, including a broken ankle, but managed to crawl to a nearby German village the next morning, where he was paraded through the street.

He spent 10 months recovering in hospital before being transferred to Stalag IX-C prisoner-of-war camp. He made two escape attempts, the second of which was successful as he made contact with a unit of the US Third Army.

Jackson's exploit became known when the surviving crewmen of his bomber were released from German captivity at the end of the war. He was promoted to warrant officer and his Victoria Cross (VC) award was gazetted on 26 October 1945. When he went to Buckingham Palace to receive his VC from King George VI, he was accompanied by Leonard Cheshire, who was also due to receive his on that day. Group Captain Cheshire insisted that, despite the difference in rank, they should approach the King together. Jackson remembers that Cheshire said to the King, "This chap stuck his neck out more than I did – he should get his VC first! Of course the King had to keep to protocol but I will never forget what Cheshire said."

=== Lancaster (ME669) crew ===
- Pilot – Flying Officer Frederick Manuel Mifflin – killed in action on April 27, 1944.
- Navigator (N) – Flight Sergeant Frank Lewis Higgins – imprisoned in Stalag 357 Kopernikus prisoner-of-war camp.
- Bomb Aimer (B) – Flight Sergeant Maurice Harry Toft – imprisoned in Stalag 357 Kopernikus prisoner-of-war camp.
- Wireless Operator/Air Gunner (WOP/AG) – Flight Sergeant Ernest "Sandy" Sandelands – imprisoned in Stalag 357 Kopernikus prisoner-of-war camp.
- Air Gunner (AG) – Flight Sergeant Walter "Smudger" Smith – imprisoned in Stalag 357 Kopernikus prisoner-of-war camp.
- Air Gunner (AG) – Flight Sergeant Norman Hugh Johnson – killed in action on April 27, 1944.

=== Victoria Cross citation ===
Extract from Fourth Supplement, The London Gazette No 37324 of Friday 26 October 1945:

The KING has been graciously pleased to confer the VICTORIA CROSS in recognition of most conspicuous bravery to:-

905192 Sergeant (Now Warrant Officer) Norman Cyril Jackson R.A.F.V.R., 106 Squadron.

This airman was the flight engineer in a Lancaster detailed to attack Schweinfurt on the night of 26th April 1944. Bombs were dropped successfully and the aircraft was climbing out of the target area. Suddenly it was attacked by a fighter at about 20,000 feet. The captain took evading action at once, but the enemy secured many hits. A fire started near a petrol tank on the upper surface of the starboard wing, between the fuselage and the inner engine.

Sergeant Jackson was thrown to the floor during the engagement. Wounds which he received from shell splinters in the right leg and shoulder were probably sustained at that time. Recovering himself, he remarked that he could deal with the fire on the wing and obtained his captain's permission to try to put out the flames.

Pushing a hand fire-extinguisher into the top of his life-saving jacket and clipping on his parachute pack, Sergeant Jackson jettisoned the escape hatch above the pilot's head. He then started to climb out of the cockpit and back along the top of the fuselage to the starboard wing. Before he could leave the fuselage his parachute pack opened and the whole canopy and rigging lines spilled into the cockpit.

Undeterred, Sergeant Jackson continued. The pilot (Fred Mifflin), bomb aimer (Maurice Toft) and navigator (Frank Higgins) gathered the parachute together and held on to the rigging lines, paying them out as the airman crawled aft. Eventually he slipped and, falling from the fuselage to the starboard wing, grasped an air intake on the leading edge of the wing. He succeeded in clinging on but lost the extinguisher, which was blown away.

By this time, the fire had spread rapidly and Sergeant Jackson was involved. His face, hands and clothing were severely burnt. Unable to retain his hold he was swept through the flames and over the trailing edge of the wing, dragging his parachute behind. When last seen it was only partly inflated and was burning in a number of places.

Realising that the fire could not be controlled, the captain gave the order to abandon aircraft. Four of the remaining members of the crew landed safely. The captain and rear gunner have not been accounted for.

Sergeant Jackson was unable to control his descent and landed heavily. He sustained a broken ankle, his right eye was closed through burns and his hands were useless. These injuries, together with the wounds received earlier, reduced him to a pitiable state. At daybreak he crawled to the nearest village, where he was taken prisoner. He bore the intense pain and discomfort of the journey to Dulag Luft with magnificent fortitude. After ten months in hospital he made a good recovery, though his hands require further treatment and are only of limited use.

This airman's attempt to extinguish the fire and save the aircraft and crew from falling into enemy hands was an act of outstanding gallantry. To venture outside, when travelling at 200 miles an hour, at a great height and in intense cold, was an almost incredible feat. Had he succeeded in subduing the flames, there was little or no prospect of his regaining the cockpit. The spilling of his parachute and the risk of grave damage to its canopy reduced his chances of survival to a minimum. By his ready willingness to face these dangers he set an example of self-sacrifice which will ever be remembered.

== Postwar and personal life ==
After the war, he worked as a travelling salesman of Haig whisky.

He and his wife Alma had seven children. Jackson died on 26 March 1994 at Hampton Hill, in the London Borough of Richmond upon Thames, and is buried in Twickenham Cemetery.

== Legacy ==
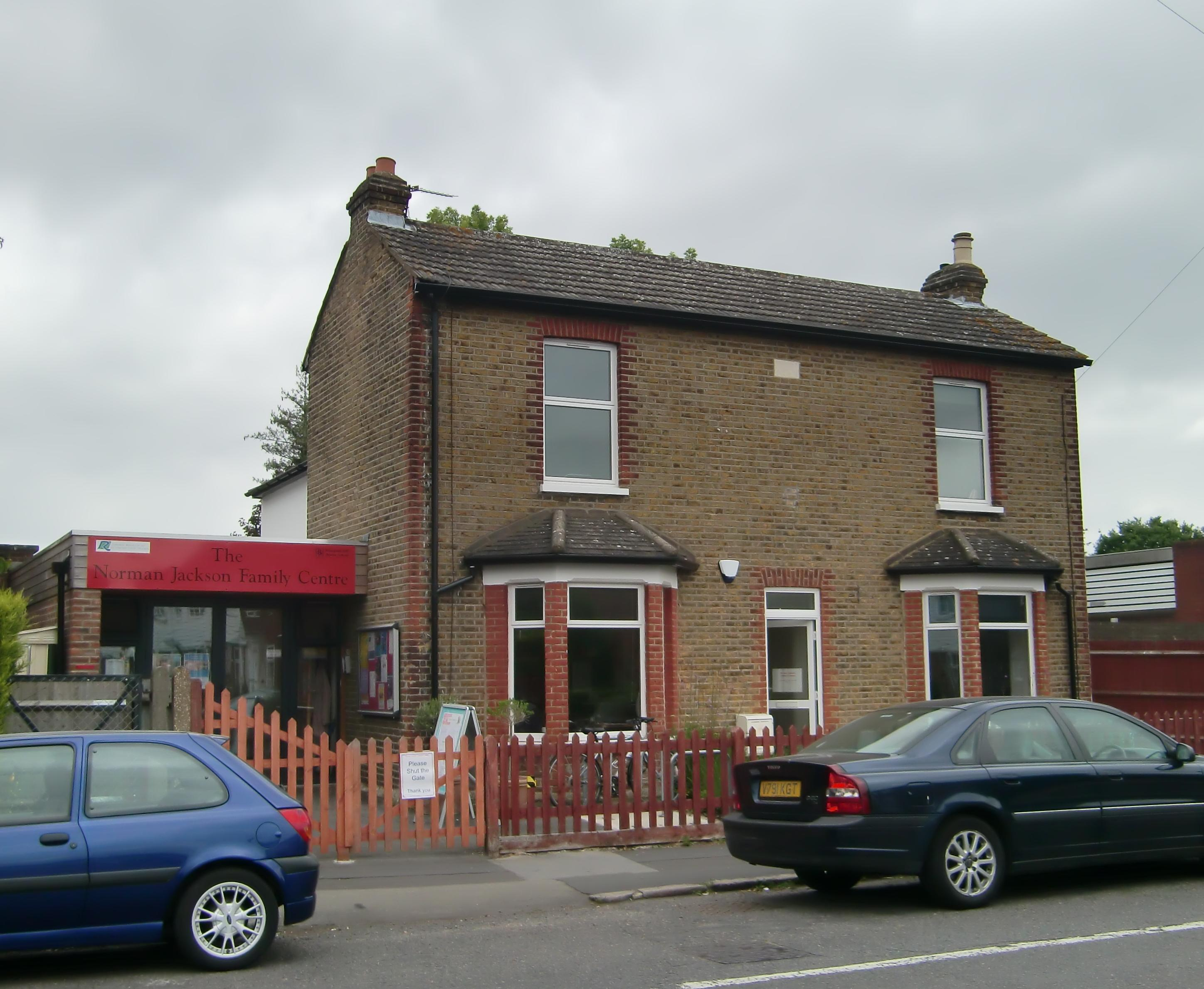
The Norman Jackson Centre in Hampton Hill was named after him.

In April 2004, Jackson's VC medal was sold at auction to Lord Ashcroft for £235,250 (GBP) against a pre-auction estimate of £130,000. His family were upset because the medal went to a private bidder rather than the RAF museum at Hendon. They had planned to give their father's medals to the museum, but found they could not do so under the terms of their mother's will and the museum was outbid. His VC was on display in the Lord Ashcroft Gallery at the Imperial War Museum, London, prior to the exhibit's closure.

Norman Jackson's son appeared in the episode on his father's crew in Lord Ashcroft's documentary series Heroes of the Skies (broadcast on Channel Five on 4 October 2012), as well as the Discovery Channel's Air Aces (premiering October 2013), and Air Aces:Full Throttle (premiering 17 March 2014). On Nov. 16 2024, the YouTube channel "Yarnhub" published an animated dramatization of this spectacular flight."YouTube". YouTube. 16 November 2024.

== See also ==
- James Allen Ward, a bomber pilot who was awarded the Victoria Cross for climbing out of his flying bomber to put out a wing fire

== Sources ==
- British VCs of World War 2 (John Laffin, 1997)
- Monuments To Courage (David Harvey, 1999)
- The Register of the Victoria Cross (This England, 1997)
- Bravest of the Brave (John Glanfield, 2005)
