= Francis Francis (cricketer) =

English cricketer

Personal information
- Full name: Francis Philip Francis
- Born: 15 September 1852; Upminster, Essex, England
- Died: 18 January 1926 (aged 73); Claygate, Surrey, England
- Batting: Right-handed
- Role: Wicket-keeper

Domestic team information
- Years: Team
- 1881: Middlesex

Career statistics
Competition	FC
Matches	1
Runs scored	–
Batting average	–
100s/50s	–/–
Top score	–
Balls bowled	–
Wickets	–
Bowling average	–
5 wickets in innings	–
10 wickets in match	–
Best bowling	–
Catches/stumpings	–/–
- Source: Cricinfo, 24 February 2011

Francis Philip Francis (15 September 1852 – 18 January 1926) was an English cricketer. Francis was a right-handed batsman who fielded as a wicket-keeper. He was born in Upminster, Essex.

Francis made a single first-class appearance for Middlesex in 1881 against Surrey at Lord's. In his only first-class match he wasn't required to bat or bowl. He also played a number of matches for Essex before they were granted first-class status.

He died in Claygate, Surrey on 18 January 1926.
