= Henry Robinson Hartley =

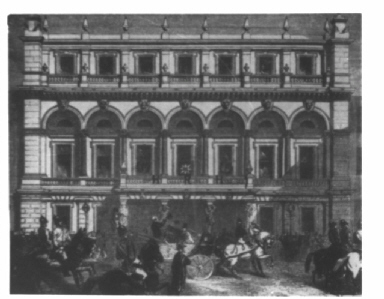
- The arrival of Prime Minister Lord Palmerston for the opening of the Hartley Institute on 15 October 1862
- Born: 12 November 1777; Southampton, Hampshire
- Died: 24 May 1850 (aged 72); Calais, France
- Resting place: Bunhill Fields, London
- Notable work: Benefactor behind the founding of the Hartley Institute (today's University of Southampton)
- Spouse: Celia Anne Crowcher (1779–1848) (m. 1798–1802)
- Children: Sarah Anne Hartley (c. 1802– unknown) - disputed paternity
- Parents: Henry Hartley (1731–1800); Susanna Lavender (1742–1821)

Henry Robinson Hartley (12 November 1777 Southampton – 24 May 1850 Calais, France) was an English eccentric and philanthropist. He was the benefactor behind the founding of Southampton's Hartley Institute or Hartley Institution, which later became the University of Southampton.

== Early life ==
Henry's parents were Henry Hartley (1731–1800) and Susanna née Lavender (1742–1821). His father was a mayor of Southampton, a Justice of the Peace, and also a strict Calvinist who had inherited a successful wine business from his childless uncle George Robinson (1700–1776).

The young Henry was baptised at Holyrood Church, Southampton. Later, he attended Southampton Grammar School (now King Edward VI School, Southampton). As a youth, probably as a reaction against his strict upbringing, he adopted a libertine lifestyle. This left him with venereal disease which gave him problems during the rest of his life. His marriage to Celia Anne Crowcher (1779–1848) on 24 November 1798 at St Mary's Church, Portsea was a failure and was annulled in 1802. He disputed the paternity of their only daughter, Sarah Anne, and never publicly acknowledged her.

== Later life and death ==
In 1821 he inherited a townhouse and a considerable fortune on his mother's death. He led a reclusive life and, in 1825, left Southampton never to return, spending his time between Calais in France and Newington, Surrey, near London. In 1842, he made a will leaving most of his estate to the city of Southampton. He wished his house to become a museum designed to promote the study of natural history, astronomy, antiquities, classics, and oriental literature. In 1850, he died in Calais, France, and was buried in the Dissenters' burial ground, Bunhill Fields, in London.

== Legacy ==
Death duties swallowed one half of Hartley's £100,000 estate. His daughter challenged his will and took a portion of the residual value. Using the remaining funds, the City of Southampton founded the Hartley Institute (1862) by combining a museum, library and venue for public lectures. This Institute became, in turn, Hartley College (1896), Hartley University College (1902), University College of Southampton (1914), and eventually the University of Southampton (1952). Hartley's house was demolished.
