= Mary Cassatt =

American painter and printmaker (1844–1926)

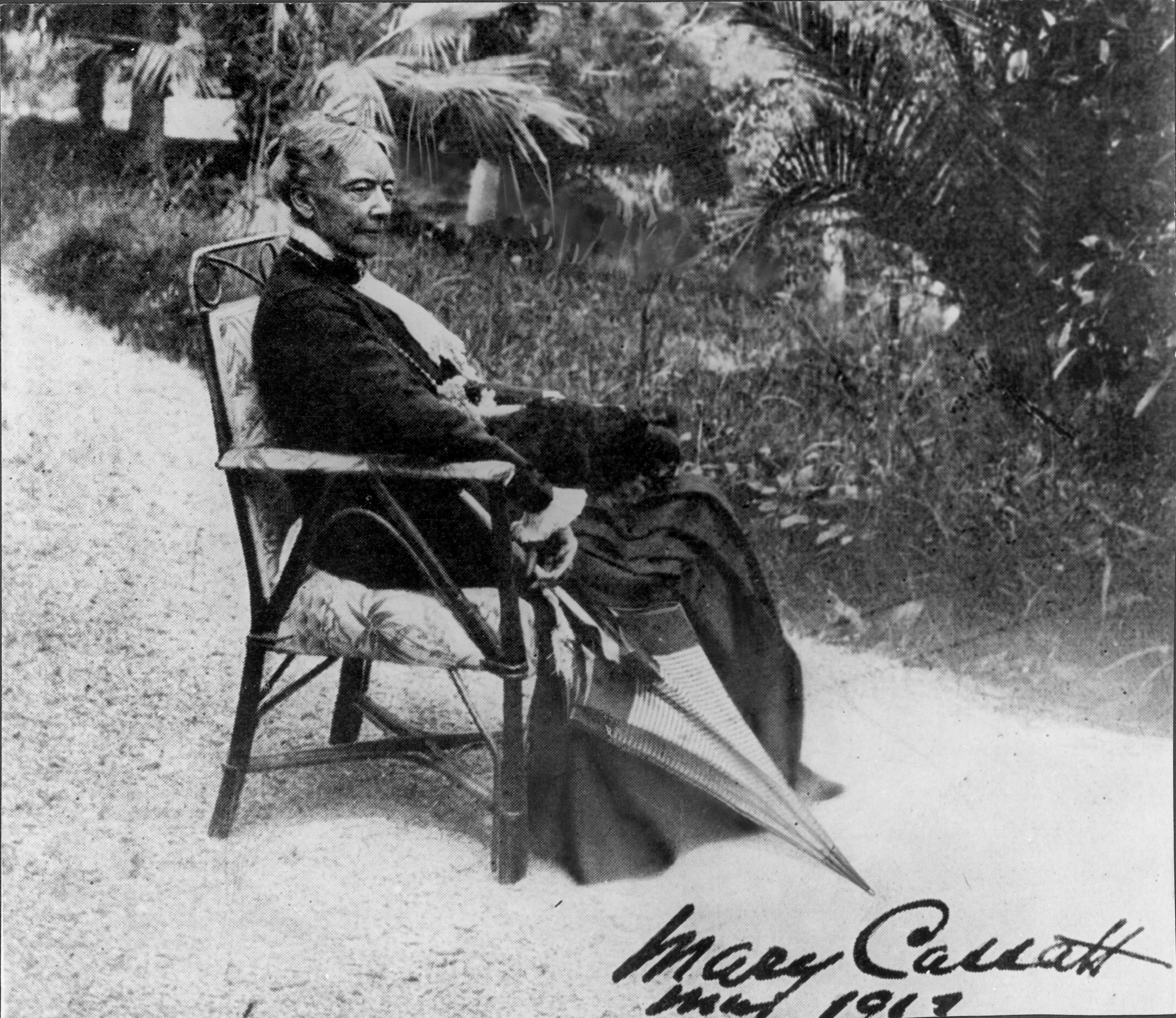
- Cassatt seated in a chair with an umbrella, 1913. Verso reads "The only photograph for which she ever posed."
- Born: Mary Stevenson Cassatt; May 22, 1844; Allegheny, Pennsylvania, US
- Died: June 14, 1926 (aged 82) near Paris, France
- Education: Pennsylvania Academy of the Fine Arts, Jean-Léon Gérôme, Charles Chaplin, Thomas Couture
- Known for: Painting, printmaking
- Movement: Impressionism

Signature
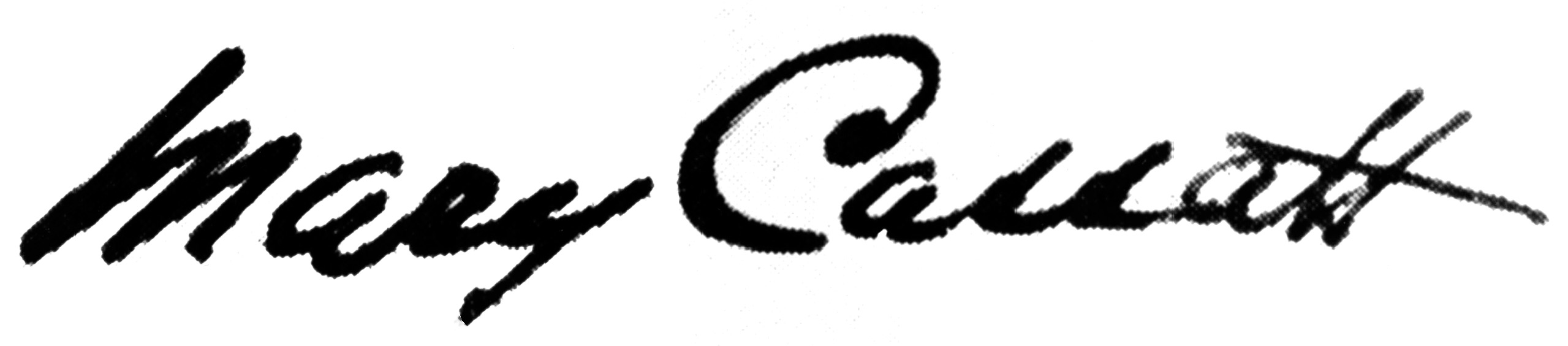

Mary Stevenson Cassatt (/kəˈsæt/; May 22, 1844 – June 14, 1926) was an American painter and printmaker. She was born in Allegheny, Pennsylvania (now part of Pittsburgh's North Side), but lived most of her adult life in France, where she befriended Edgar Degas and exhibited with the Impressionists. Cassatt often created images of the social and private lives of women, with particular emphasis on the intimate bonds between mothers and children.

She was described by Gustave Geffroy as one of "les trois grandes dames" (the three great ladies) of Impressionism alongside Marie Bracquemond and Berthe Morisot. In 1879, Diego Martelli compared her to Degas, as they both sought to depict movement, light, and design in the most modern sense. She also played an important role in introducing Impressionism to American collectors, notably through her friendship with the Havemeyer family.

== Early life ==
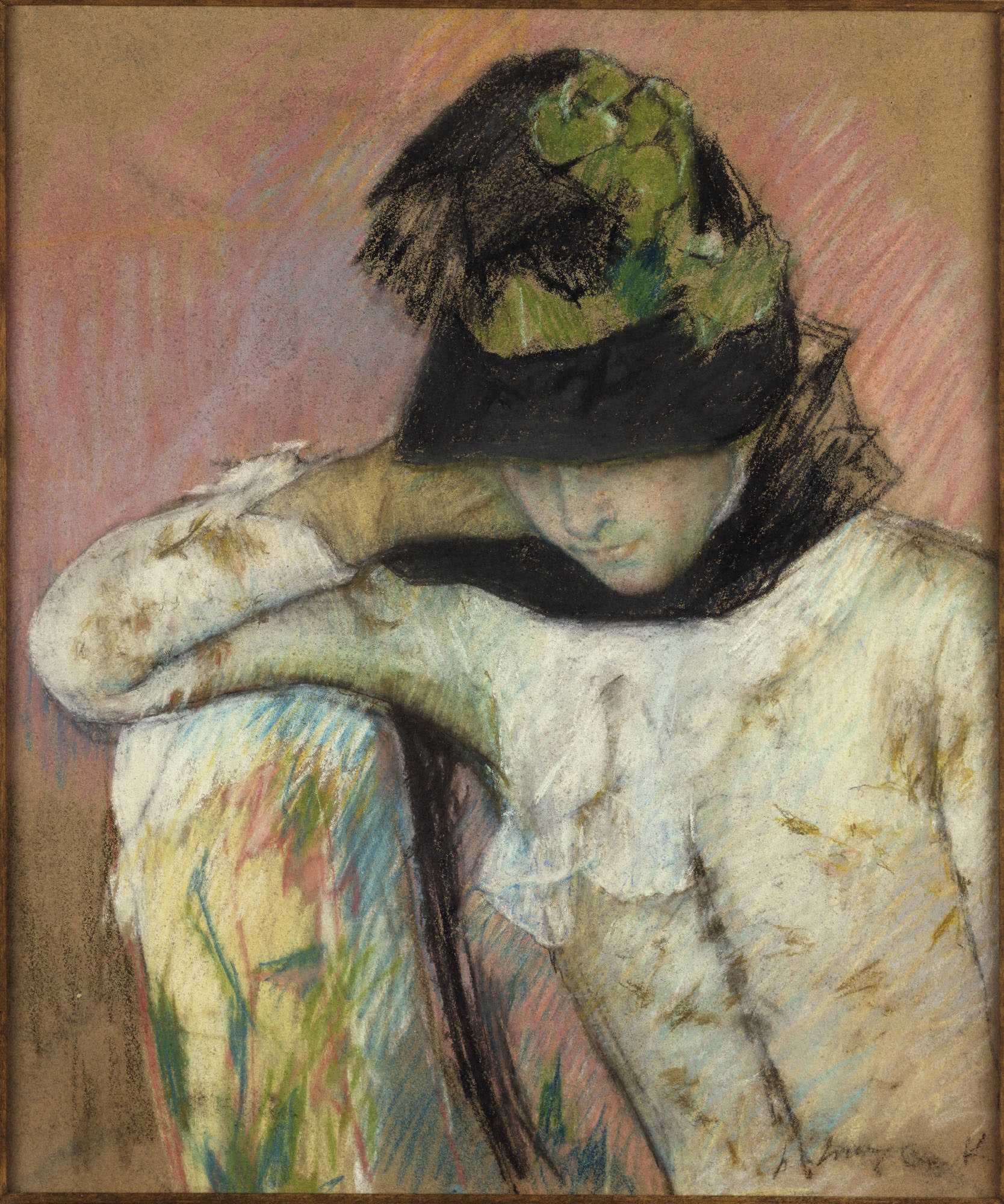
Young Woman in a Black and Green Bonnet, c. 1890, Princeton University Art Museum

Cassatt was born in Allegheny, Pennsylvania, which is now part of Pittsburgh. She was born into an upper-middle-class family: Her father, Robert Simpson Cassat (later Cassatt), was a successful stockbroker and land speculator. The ancestral name had been Cossart, with the family descended from French Huguenot Jacques Cossart, who came to New Amsterdam in 1662. Her mother, Katherine Kelso Johnston, came from a banking family. Katherine Cassatt, educated and well-read, had a profound influence on her daughter. To that effect, Cassatt's lifelong friend Louisine Havemeyer wrote in her memoirs: "Anyone who had the privilege of knowing Mary Cassatt's mother would know at once that it was from her and her alone that [Mary] inherited her ability." A distant cousin of artist Robert Henri, Cassatt was one of seven children, of whom two died in infancy. One brother, Alexander Johnston Cassatt, later became president of the Pennsylvania Railroad. The family moved eastward, first to Lancaster, Pennsylvania, then to the Philadelphia area, where she started her schooling at the age of six.

Cassatt grew up in an environment that viewed travel as an integral part of a well-rounded education. She spent five years in Europe and visited many of the capitals, including London, Paris, and Berlin. While abroad, she learned German and French and had her first lessons in drawing and music. It is likely that her first exposure to French artists Jean Auguste Dominique Ingres, Eugène Delacroix, Camille Corot, and Gustave Courbet was at the Paris World's Fair of 1855. Also in the exhibition were Edgar Degas and Camille Pissarro, both of whom were later her colleagues and mentors.

Though her family objected to her becoming a professional artist, Cassatt began studying painting at the Pennsylvania Academy of the Fine Arts in Philadelphia at the early age of 15. Part of her parents' concern may have been Cassatt's exposure to feminist ideas and the bohemian behavior of some of the male students. Cassatt and her network of friends became lifelong advocates of equal rights for the sexes. Although about 20% of the students were female, most viewed art as a socially valuable skill. Few of them were determined, as Cassatt was, to make art their career. She continued her studies from 1861 through 1865, during the American Civil War. Thomas Eakins was among her fellow students; he was later forced to resign as director of the academy.

Impatient with the slow pace of instruction and the patronizing attitude of the male students and teachers, she decided to study the old masters on her own. She later said: "There was no teaching" at the academy. Female students could not use live models until somewhat later, and the principal training was primarily drawing from casts.

Cassatt decided to end her studies. At that time, no degree was granted. After overcoming her father's objections, she moved to Paris in 1866, with her mother and family friends acting as chaperones. Since women could not yet attend the École des Beaux-Arts, Cassatt applied to study privately with masters from the school and was accepted to study with Jean-Léon Gérôme, a highly regarded teacher known for his hyper-realistic technique and his depiction of exotic subjects. (A few months later, Gérôme also accepted Eakins as a student.) Cassatt augmented her artistic training with daily copying in the Louvre, obtaining the required permit, which was necessary to control the "copyists", usually low-paid women, who daily filled the museum to paint copies for sale. The museum also served as a social place for Frenchmen and American female students, who, like Cassatt, were not allowed to attend cafes where the avant-garde socialized. In this manner, fellow artist and friend Elizabeth Jane Gardner met and married famed academic painter William-Adolphe Bouguereau.

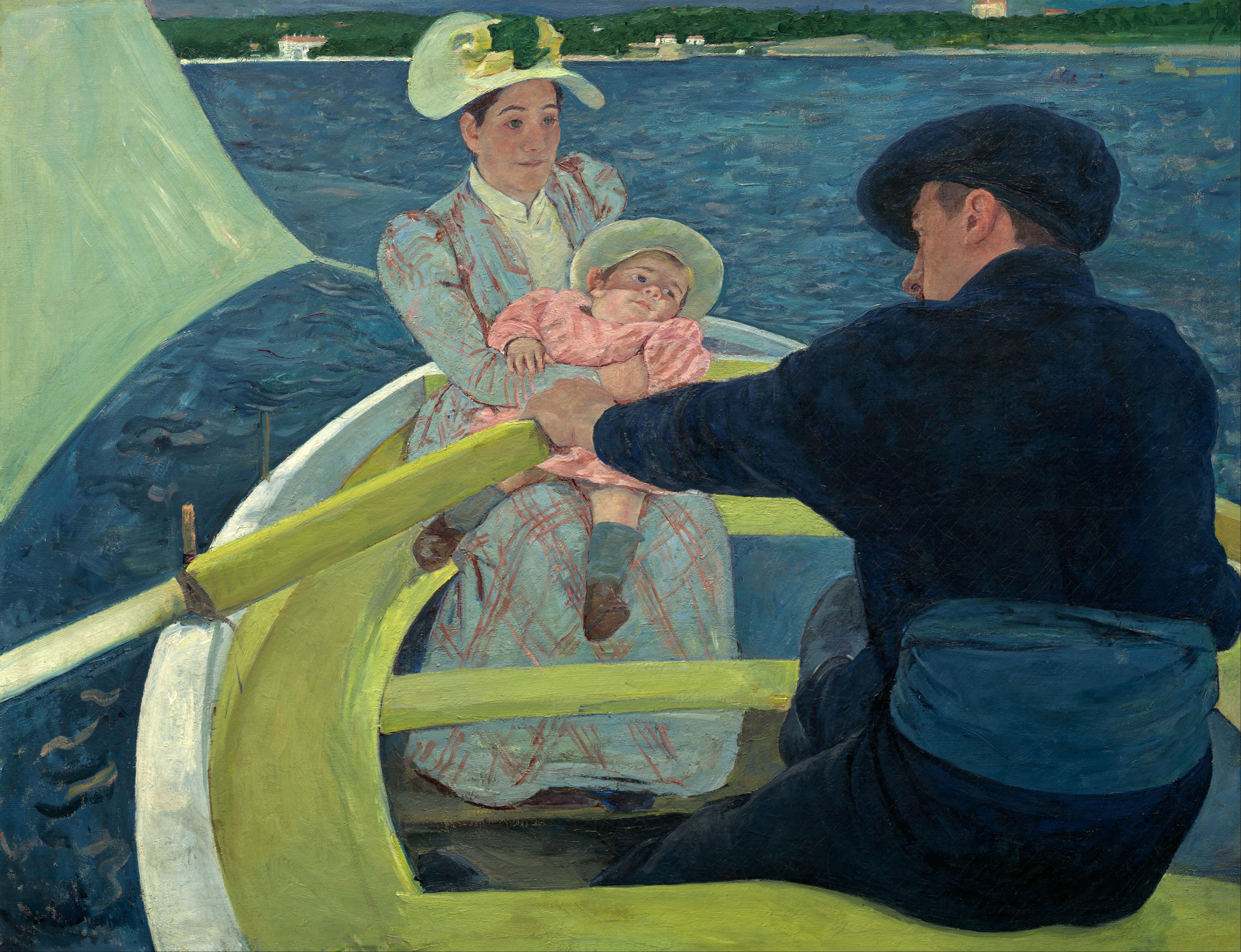
The Boating Party by Mary Cassatt, 1893–94, oil on canvas, 35½ × 46 in., National Gallery of Art, Washington

Toward the end of 1866, she joined a painting class taught by Charles Joshua Chaplin, a genre artist. In 1868, Cassatt also studied with artist Thomas Couture, whose subjects were mostly romantic and urban. On trips to the countryside, the students drew from life, particularly the peasants going about their daily activities. In 1868, one of her paintings, A Mandoline Player, was accepted for the first time by the selection jury for the Paris Salon. With Elizabeth Jane Gardner, whose work was also accepted by the jury that year, Cassatt was one of two American women to first exhibit in the Salon. A Mandoline Player is in the Romantic style of Corot and Couture, and is one of only two paintings from the first decade of her career that is documented today.

The French art scene was in a process of change, as radical artists such as Courbet and Édouard Manet tried to break away from accepted Academic tradition, and the Impressionists were in their formative years. Cassatt's friend Eliza Haldeman wrote home that artists "are leaving the Academy style and each seeking a new way, consequently just now everything is Chaos." Cassatt, on the other hand, continued to work in the traditional manner, submitting works to the Salon for over ten years, with increasing frustration.

Returning to the United States in the late summer of 1870—as the Franco-Prussian War was starting—Cassatt lived with her family in Altoona. Her father continued to resist her chosen vocation, paying for her basic needs but not her art supplies. Cassatt placed two of her paintings in a New York gallery and found many admirers but no purchasers. She was also dismayed at the lack of paintings to study while staying at her summer residence. Cassatt even considered giving up art, as she was determined to make a living independently. She wrote in a letter of July 1871, "I have given up my studio & torn up my father's portrait, & have not touched a brush for six weeks nor ever will again until I see some prospect of getting back to Europe. I am very anxious to go out west next fall & get some employment, but I have not yet decided where."

Cassatt traveled to Chicago to try her luck, but lost some of her early paintings in the Great Chicago Fire of 1871. Shortly afterward, her work attracted the attention of Roman Catholic Bishop Michael Domenec of Pittsburgh, who commissioned her to paint two copies of paintings by Correggio in Parma, Italy, advancing her enough money to cover her travel expenses and part of her stay. In her excitement she wrote, "O how wild I am to get to work, my fingers farely itch & my eyes water to see a fine picture again". With Emily Sartain, a fellow artist from a well-regarded artistic family from Philadelphia, Cassatt set out for Europe again.

== Impressionism ==
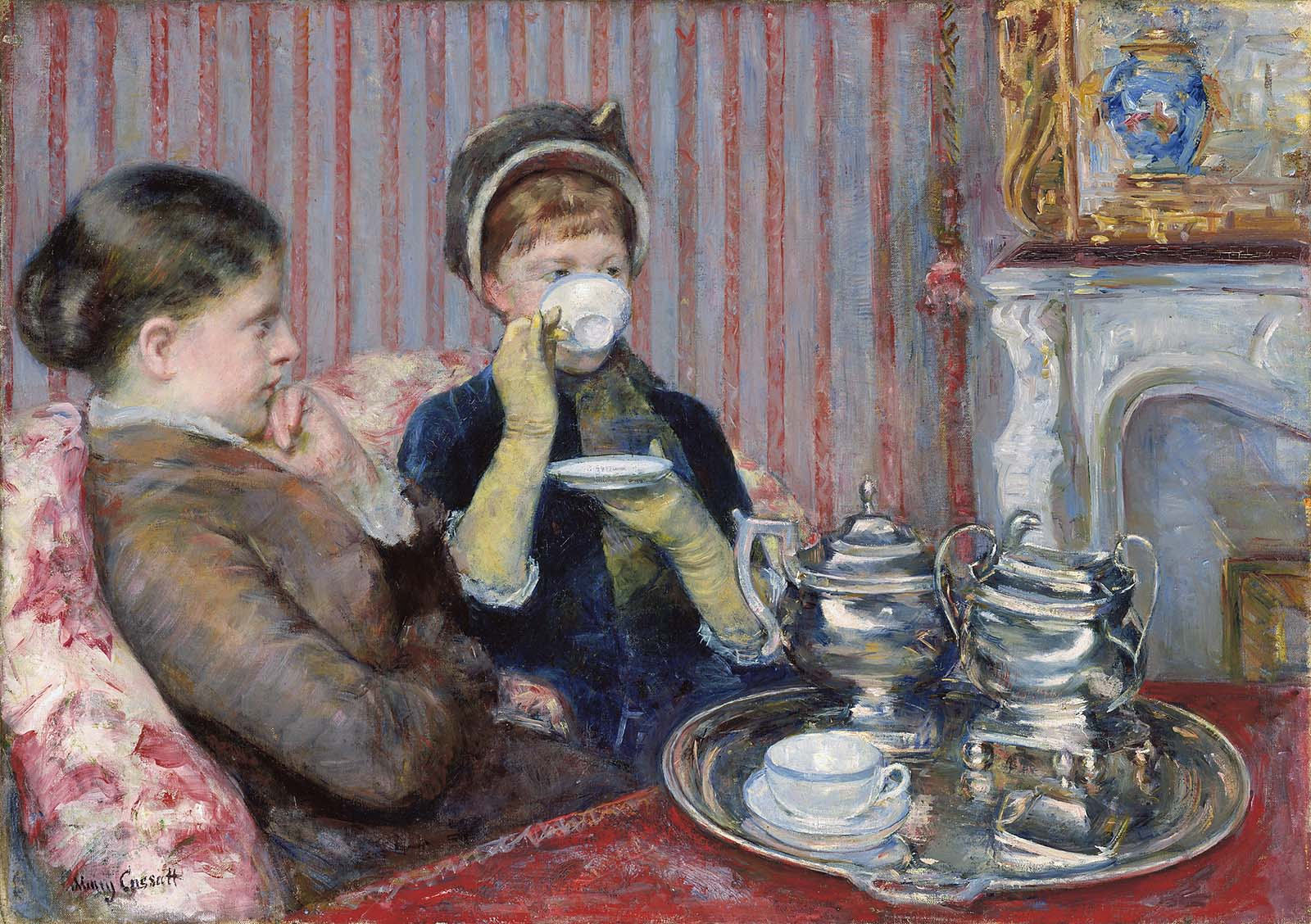
The Tea by Mary Cassatt, 1880, oil on canvas, 25½ × 36¼ in., Museum of Fine Arts, Boston

Within months of her return to Europe in the autumn of 1871, Cassatt's prospects had brightened. Her painting Two Women Throwing Flowers During Carnival was well received in the Salon of 1872 and was purchased. She attracted much favorable notice in Parma and was supported and encouraged by the art community there: "All Parma is talking of Miss Cassatt and her picture, and everyone is anxious to know her".

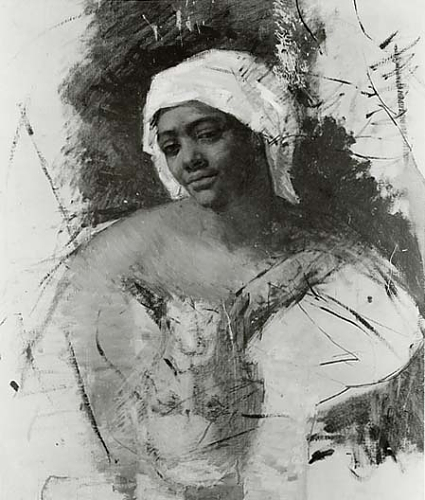
Oil, c. 1871, private collection. Mrs. Currey had worked for the Cassatt family. When Mary Cassatt returned home from Paris at the outbreak of the Franco-Prussian War, she asked Mrs. Currey to pose for her and gave her the sketch. Superimposed (the canvas turned upside down) is a sketch of her father.

After completing her commission for the bishop, Cassatt traveled to Madrid and Seville, where she painted a group of paintings of Spanish subjects, including Spanish Dancer Wearing a Lace Mantilla (1873, in the National Museum of American Art, Smithsonian Institution). In 1874, she made the decision to take up residence in France. She was joined by her sister, Lydia, who shared an apartment with her. Cassatt opened a studio in Paris. Louisa May Alcott's sister, Abigail May Alcott, was then an art student in Paris and visited Cassatt. Cassatt continued to express criticism of the politics of the Salon and the conventional taste that prevailed there. She was blunt in her comments, as reported by Sartain, who wrote: "she is entirely too slashing, snubs all modern art, disdains the Salon pictures of Cabanel, Bonnat, all the names we are used to revere".

Cassatt saw that works by female artists were often dismissed with contempt unless the artist had a friend or protector on the jury, and she would not flirt with jurors to curry favor. Her cynicism grew when one of the two pictures she submitted in 1875 was refused by the jury, only to be accepted the following year after she darkened the background. She had quarrels with Sartain, who thought Cassatt too outspoken and self-centered, and eventually they parted. Out of her distress and self-criticism, Cassatt decided that she needed to move away from genre paintings and onto more fashionable subjects, in order to attract portrait commissions from American socialites abroad, but that attempt bore little fruit at first.

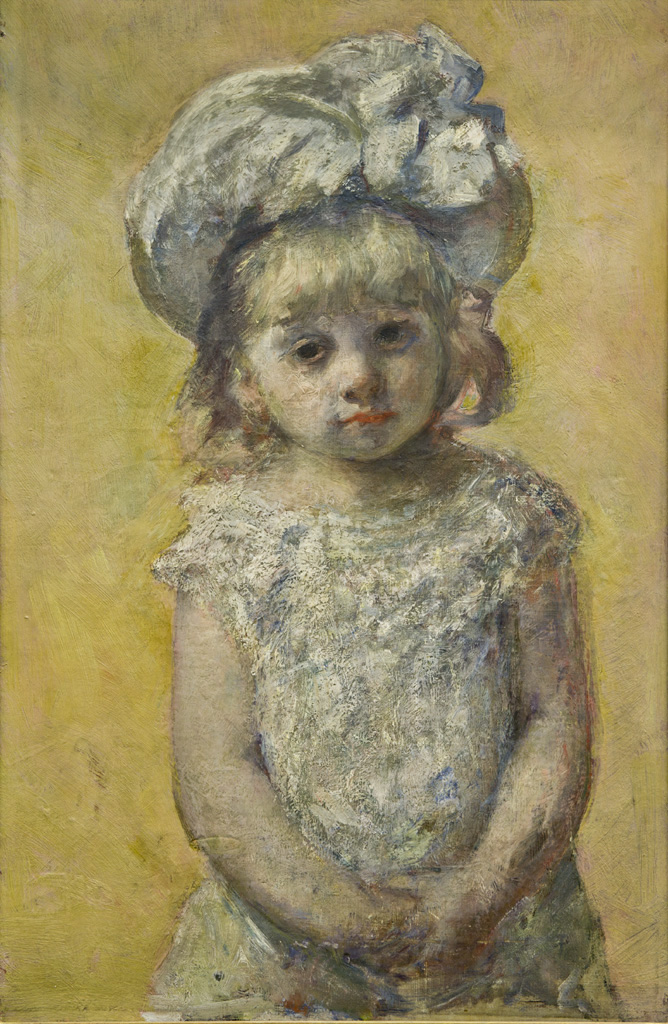
Portrait de fillette, 1879, Musée des Beaux-Arts de Bordeaux

In 1877, both her entries were rejected, and for the first time in seven years, she had no works in the Salon. At this low point in her career, she was invited by Edgar Degas to show her works with the Impressionists, a group that had begun their own series of independent exhibitions in 1874 with much attendant notoriety. The Impressionists (also known as the "Independents" or "Intransigents") had no formal manifesto and varied considerably in subject matter and technique. They tended to prefer plein air painting and the application of vibrant color in separate strokes with little pre-mixing, which allows the eye to merge the results in an "impressionistic" manner. The Impressionists had been receiving the wrath of the critics for several years. Henry Bacon, a friend of the Cassatts, thought that the Impressionists were so radical that they were "afflicted with some hitherto unknown disease of the eye". They already had one female member, artist Berthe Morisot, who became Cassatt's friend and colleague. The only American officially associated with the Impressionists, Cassatt would go on to exhibit in half of the group's later exhibitions

Cassatt admired Degas, whose pastels had made a powerful impression on her when she encountered them in an art dealer's window in 1875. "I used to go and flatten my nose against that window and absorb all I could of his art," she later recalled. "It changed my life. I saw art then as I wanted to see it." She accepted Degas' invitation with enthusiasm and began preparing paintings for the next Impressionist show, planned for 1878, which (after a postponement because of the World's Fair) took place on April 10, 1879. She felt comfortable with the Impressionists and joined their cause enthusiastically, declaring: "we are carrying on a despairing fight & need all our forces". Unable to attend cafes with them without attracting unfavorable attention, she met with them privately and at exhibitions. She now hoped for commercial success selling paintings to the sophisticated Parisians who preferred the avant-garde. Her style had gained a new spontaneity during the intervening two years. Previously a studio-bound artist, she had adopted the practice of carrying a sketchbook with her while out-of-doors or at the theater, and recording the scenes she saw.

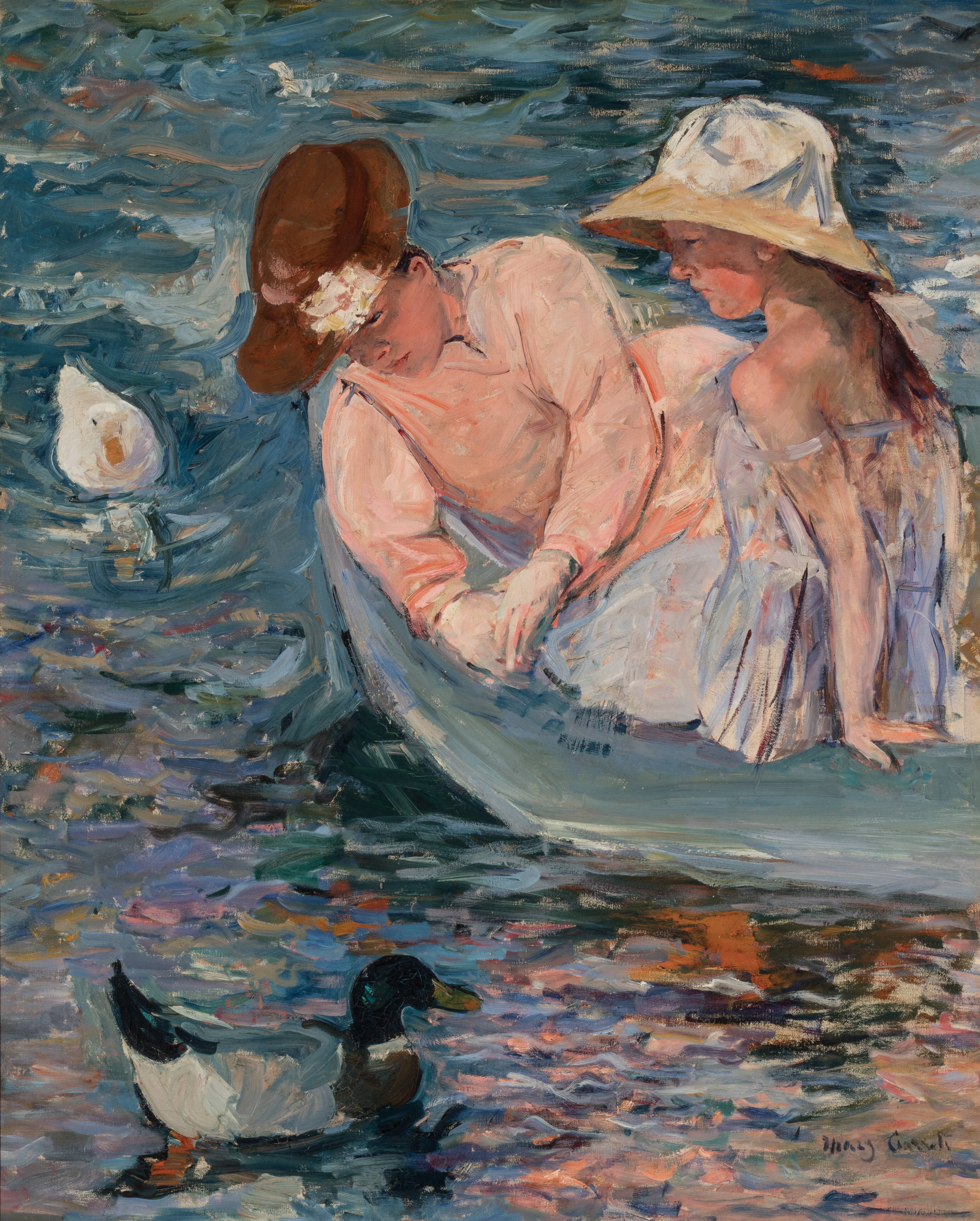
Summertime by Mary Cassatt, c. 1894, oil on canvas, Terra Foundation for American Art, Chicago

In 1877, Cassatt was joined in Paris by her father and mother, who returned with her sister Lydia, all eventually to share a large apartment on the fifth floor of 13, Avenue Trudaine. Mary valued their companionship, as neither she nor Lydia had married. A case was made that Mary had narcissistic disturbance, never completing the recognition of herself as a person outside of the orbit of her mother. Mary had decided early in life that marriage would be incompatible with her career. Lydia, who was frequently painted by her sister, had recurrent bouts of illness, and her death in 1882 left Cassatt temporarily unable to work.

Cassatt's father insisted that her studio and supplies be covered by her sales, which were still meager. Afraid of having to paint "potboilers" to make ends meet, Cassatt applied herself to produce some quality paintings for the next Impressionist exhibition. Three of her most accomplished works from 1878 were Portrait of the Artist (self-portrait), Little Girl in a Blue Armchair, and Reading Le Figaro (portrait of her mother).

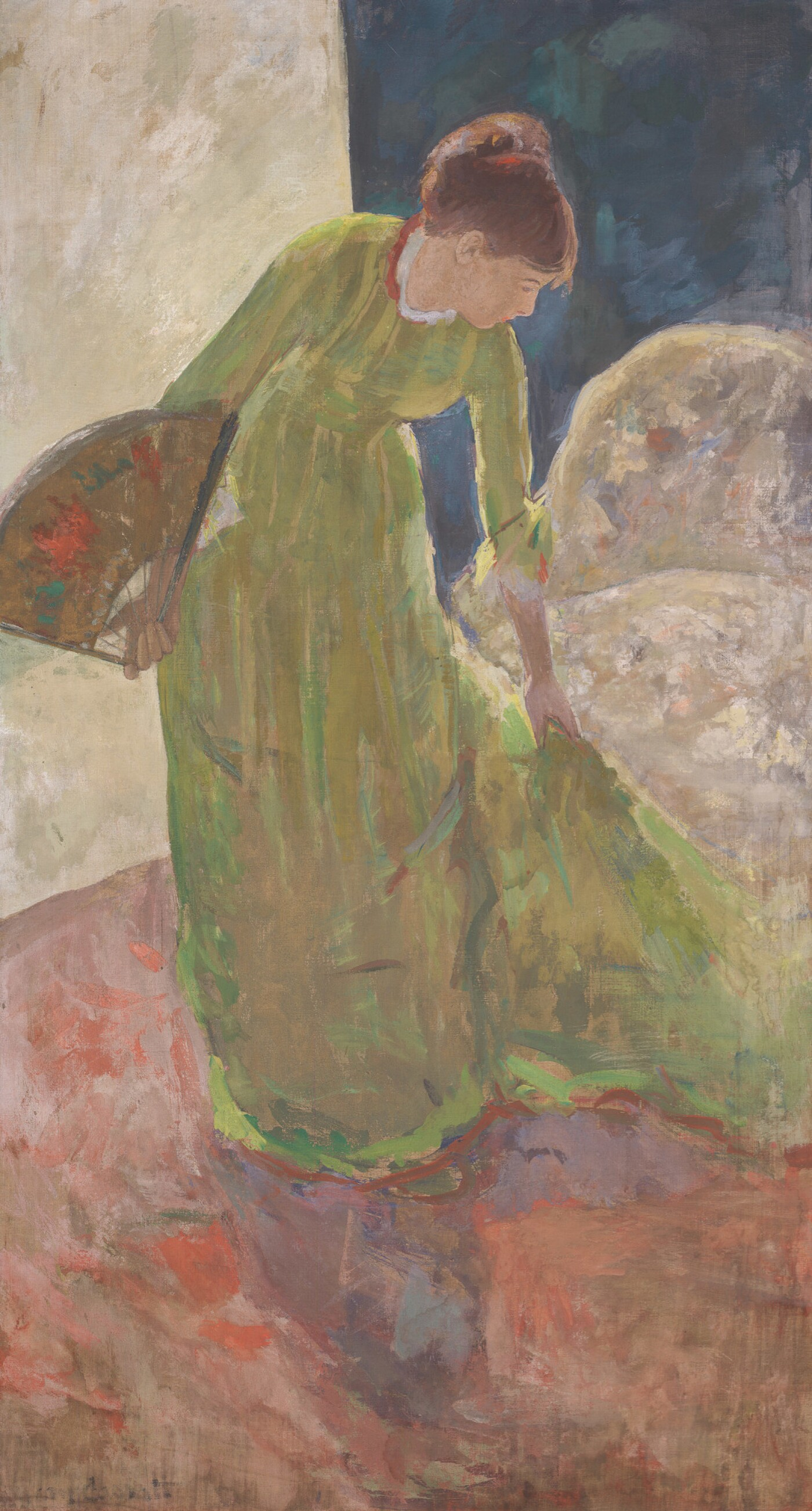
Mary Cassatt, Woman Standing Holding a Fan, 1878–79, (Amon Carter Museum of American Art)

Degas had considerable influence on Cassatt. Both were highly experimental in their use of materials, trying distemper and metallic paints in many works, such as Woman Standing Holding a Fan, 1878–79 (Amon Carter Museum of American Art).

She became extremely proficient in the use of pastels, eventually creating many of her most important works in this medium. Degas also introduced her to etching, of which he was a recognized master. The two worked side by side for a while, and her draftsmanship gained considerable strength under his tutelage. One example of her thoughtful approach to the medium of drypoint as a mode for reflecting on her status as an artist is 'Reflection' of 1889–90, which has recently been interpreted as a self-portrait. Degas in turn depicted Cassatt in a series of etchings recording their trips to the Louvre. She treasured his friendship but learned not to expect too much from his fickle and temperamental nature after a project they were collaborating on at the time, a proposed journal devoted to prints, was abruptly dropped by him. The sophisticated and well-dressed Degas, then forty-five, was a welcome dinner guest at the Cassatt residence, and likewise they at his soirées.

The Impressionist exhibit of 1879 was the most successful to date, despite the absence of Renoir, Sisley, Manet and Cézanne, who were attempting once again to gain recognition at the Salon. Through the efforts of Gustave Caillebotte, who organized and underwrote the show, the group made a profit and sold many works, although the criticism continued as harsh as ever. The Revue des Deux Mondes wrote, "M. Degas and Mlle. Cassatt are, nevertheless, the only artists who distinguish themselves... and who offer some attraction and some excuse in the pretentious show of window dressing and infantile daubing".

Cassatt displayed eleven works, including Lydia in a Loge, Wearing a Pearl Necklace, (Woman in a Loge). Although critics claimed that Cassatt's colors were too bright and that her portraits were too accurate to be flattering to the subjects, her work was not savaged as was Monet's, whose circumstances were the most desperate of all the Impressionists at that time. She used her share of the profits to purchase a work by Degas and one by Monet. She participated in the Impressionist Exhibitions that followed in 1880 and 1881, and she remained an active member of the Impressionist circle until 1886. In 1886, Cassatt provided two paintings for the first Impressionist exhibition in the US, organized by art dealer Paul Durand-Ruel. Her friend Louisine Elder married Harry Havemeyer in 1883, and with Cassatt as advisor, the couple began collecting the Impressionists on a grand scale. Much of their vast collection is now in the Metropolitan Museum of Art in New York City.

Cassatt also made several portraits of family members during that period, of which Portrait of Alexander Cassatt and His Son Robert Kelso (1885) is one of her best-regarded. Cassatt's style then evolved, and she moved away from Impressionism to a simpler, more straightforward approach. She began to exhibit her works in New York galleries as well. After 1886, Cassatt no longer identified herself with any art movement and experimented with a variety of techniques.

== Feminist viewpoints and the "New Woman" ==
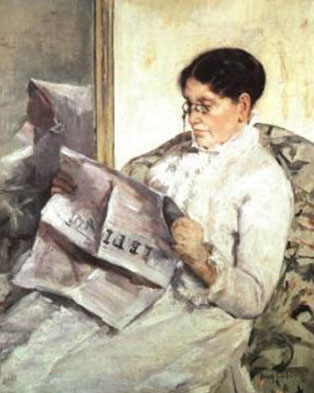
Reading "Le Figaro" by Mary Cassatt (1878), Collection Mrs. Eric de Spoelberch, Haverford, Pennsylvania

Cassatt and her contemporaries enjoyed the wave of feminism that occurred in the 1840s, allowing them access to educational institutions at newly coed colleges and universities, such as Oberlin and the University of Michigan. Likewise, women's colleges such as Vassar, Smith and Wellesley opened their doors during this time. Cassatt was an outspoken advocate for women's equality, campaigning with her friends for equal travel scholarships for students in the 1860s, and the right to vote in the 1910s.

Mary Cassatt depicted the "New Woman" of the 19th century from the woman's perspective. As a successful, highly trained woman artist who never married, Cassatt—like Ellen Day Hale, Elizabeth Coffin, Elizabeth Nourse and Cecilia Beaux—personified the "New Woman". She "initiated the profound beginnings in recreating the image of the 'new' woman", drawn from the influence of her intelligent and active mother, Katherine Cassatt, who believed in educating women to be knowledgeable and socially active. She is depicted in Reading 'Le Figaro' (1878).

Cassatt's independence and choice not to marry as a "New Woman" could also be seen as a reaction to the strict institutionalized misogamy of the art world at the time, in which a woman artist's marriage could have been seen as incompatible with any serious artistic career.

Although Cassatt did not explicitly make political statements about women's rights in her work, her artistic portrayal of women was consistently done with dignity and the suggestion of a deeper, meaningful inner life. Many of her works depict a mother caring for a child and she painted them with warmth and attention. Unlike the other Impressionists of the time who often painted street scenes and landscapes, Cassatt preferred to depict the everyday life of women and the domestic labors associated with the home. This was unusual at the time because, while Impressionist pieces typically depicted women as passive objects for the viewer, Cassatt notably made the women she painted active observers with real engagement in their environments. Cassatt's work was shaped by her time spent engaging with these women in their private, intimate spaces, something that a male artist would not have had the social ability to do at that time. This disconnect from what the two different genders were allowed to observe as artists did not go unnoticed by Cassatt, and she notably enjoyed observing the complexities of gender relations in her work. The piece In the Loge (1878) is a good example of this, as it depicts a young woman watching the opera while a male admirer gawks at her from afar. The viewer is then also included in the voyeuristic objectification of the unaware model, exposing the social dynamics of the time.

By choosing to depict more humble feminine environments Cassatt effectively raised scenes of women, their labor, friendships, and personal life to be celebrated as high art. She was often critiqued for this preference and her art dismissed as too feminine. Cassatt objected to being stereotyped as a "woman artist"; she supported women's suffrage and, in 1915, showed eighteen works in an exhibition supporting the movement organised by Louisine Havemeyer, a committed and active feminist. The exhibition brought her into conflict with her sister-in-law Eugenie Carter Cassatt, who was anti-suffrage and who boycotted the show along with Philadelphia society in general. Cassatt responded by selling off her work that was otherwise destined for her heirs. In particular The Boating Party, thought to have been inspired by the birth of Eugenie's daughter Ellen Mary, was bought by the National Gallery, Washington, D.C.

== Relationship with Degas ==
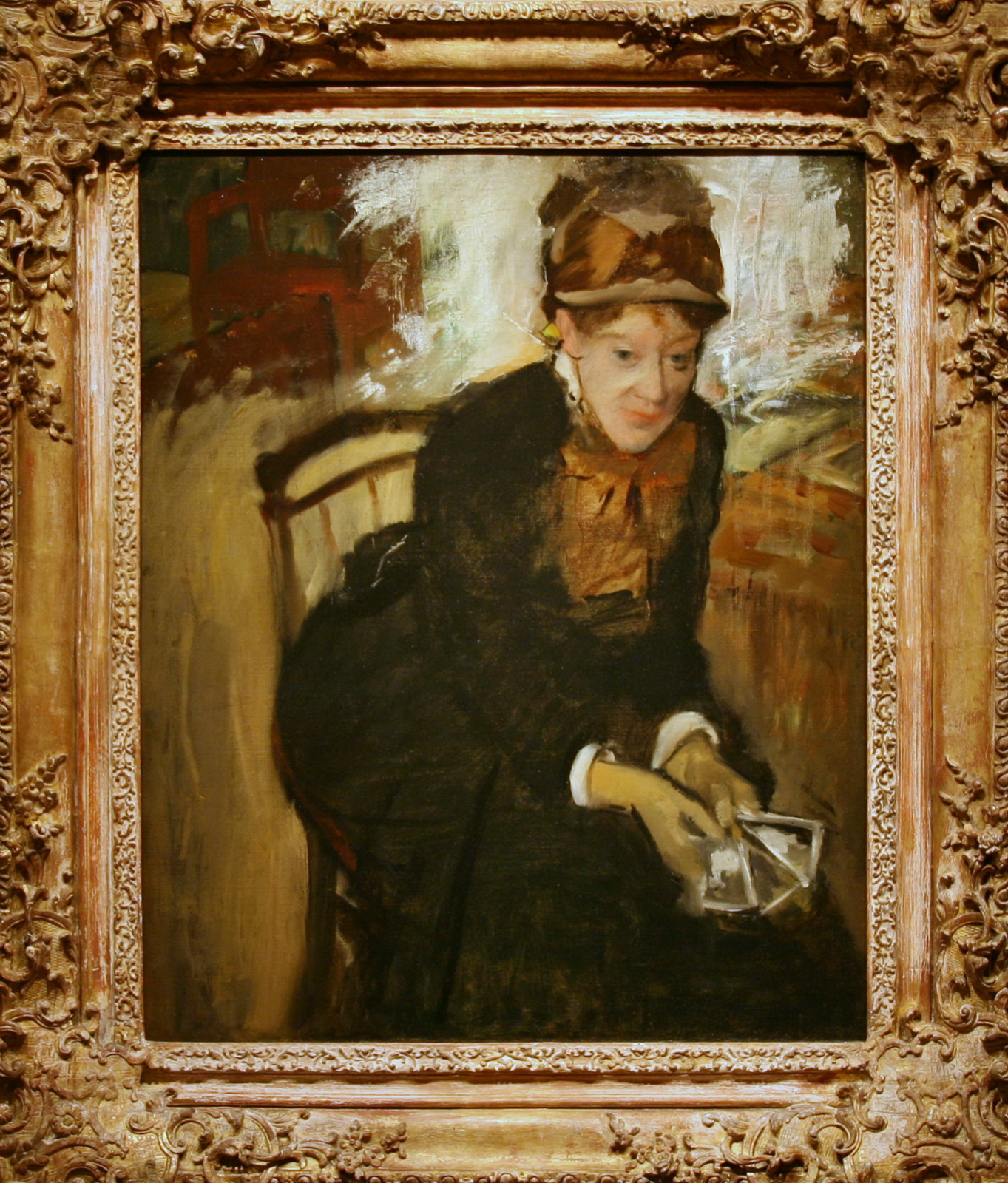
Edgar Degas, Mary Cassatt Seated, Holding Cards, c. 1880–1884, oil on canvas, 74 × 60 cm, National Portrait Gallery, Washington DC. NPG.84.34 Cassatt hated it later and wrote to her dealer Paul Durand-Ruel in 1912 or 1913 that "I don't want anyone to know that I posed for it."

Cassatt and Degas had a long period of collaboration. The two painters had studios close together, Cassatt at 19, rue Laval, Degas at 4, rue Frochot, less than a five-minute walk apart, and Degas developed the habit of looking in at Cassatt's studio and offering her advice and helping her gain models.

They had much in common: they shared similar tastes in art and literature, came from affluent backgrounds, had studied painting in Italy, and both were independent, never marrying. The degree of intimacy between them cannot be assessed now, as no letters survive, but it is unlikely they were in a sexual relationship, given their conservative social backgrounds and strong adherence to the prevalent notions of sexual morality at the time. Several of Vincent van Gogh's letters attest to Degas' sexual self-constraint. Degas introduced Cassatt to pastel and engraving, both of which Cassatt quickly mastered, while for her part, Cassatt was instrumental in helping Degas sell his paintings and promoting his reputation in America.

Both regarded themselves as figure painters, and the art historian George Shackelford suggests they were influenced by the art critic Louis Edmond Duranty's appeal in his pamphlet The New Painting for a revitalization in figure painting: "Let us take leave of the stylized human body, which is treated like a vase. What we need is the characteristic modern person in his clothes, in the midst of his social surroundings, at home or out in the street."

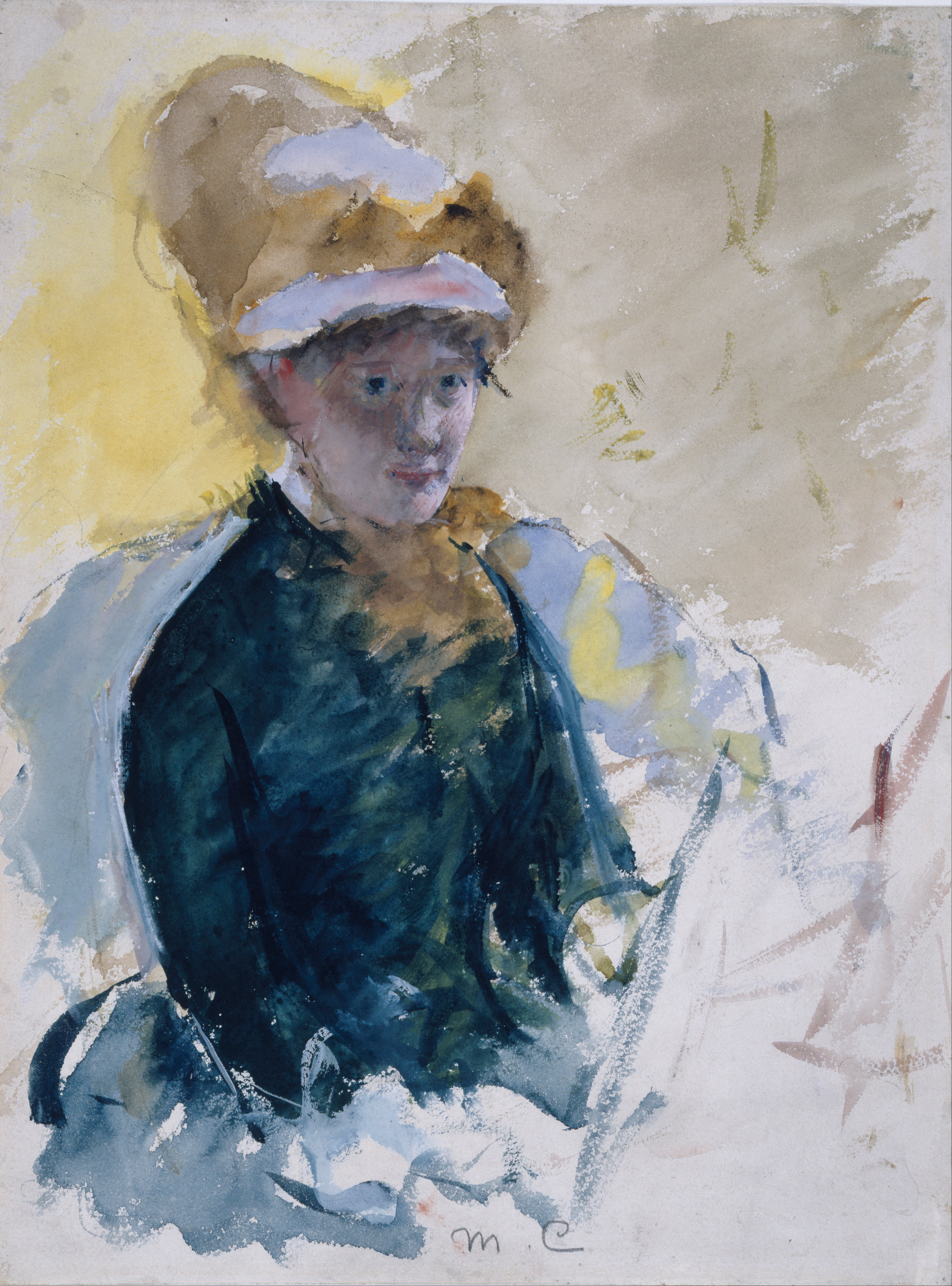
Mary Cassatt, Self-Portrait, c. 1880, gouache and watercolor over graphite on paper, 32.7 cm × 24.6 cm, National Portrait Gallery, Washington, D.C. NPG.76.33

Little Girl in a Blue Armchair, 1878

After Cassatt's parents and sister, Lydia, joined Cassatt in Paris in 1877, Degas, Cassatt, and Lydia were often to be seen at the Louvre studying artworks together. Degas produced two prints, notable for their technical innovation, depicting Cassatt at the Louvre looking at artworks while Lydia reads a guidebook. These were destined for a prints journal planned by Degas (together with Camille Pissarro and others), which never came to fruition. Cassatt frequently posed for Degas, notably for his millinery series trying on hats.

Around 1884, Degas made a portrait in oils of Cassatt, Mary Cassatt Seated, Holding Cards. (Note: The cards are probably cartes de visite, used by artists and dealers at the time to document their work. Stephanie Strasnick suggests that Degas used them as a device to represent Cassatt as a peer and an artist in her own right, although Cassatt later took an aversion to the portrait and had it sold.) A Self-Portrait (c. 1880) by Cassatt depicts her in the identical hat and dress, leading art historian Griselda Pollock to speculate they were executed in a joint painting session in the early years of their acquaintance.

Cassatt and Degas worked most closely together in the fall and winter of 1879–80, when Cassatt was mastering her printmaking technique. Degas owned a small printing press, and by day she worked at his studio using his tools and press while in the evening she made studies for the etching plate the next day. However, in April 1880, Degas abruptly withdrew from the prints journal they had been collaborating on, and without his support, the project folded. Degas' withdrawal piqued Cassatt who had worked hard at preparing a print, In the Opera Box, in a large edition of fifty impressions, no doubt destined for the journal. Although Cassatt's warm feelings for Degas were to last her entire life, she never again worked with him as closely as she had over the prints journal. Mathews notes that she ceased executing her theater scenes at this time.

Degas was forthright in his views, as was Cassatt. They clashed over the Dreyfus affair (early in her career she had executed a portrait of the art collector Moyse Dreyfus, a relative of the court-martialled lieutenant at the center of the affair). (Note: Pro-Dreyfus included Camille Pissarro, Claude Monet, Paul Signac and Mary Cassatt. Anti-Dreyfus included Edgar Degas, Paul Cézanne, Auguste Rodin and Pierre-Auguste Renoir.) Cassatt later expressed satisfaction at the irony of Lousine Havermeyer's 1915 joint exhibition of hers and Degas' work being held in aid of women's suffrage, equally capable of affectionately repeating Degas' antifemale comments as being estranged by them (when viewing her Two Women Picking Fruit for the first time, he had commented "No woman has the right to draw like that"). From the 1890s onwards their relationship took on a decidedly commercial aspect, as in general had Cassatt's other relations with the Impressionist circle; nevertheless they continued to visit each other until Degas died in 1917.

In 2014, the National Gallery of Art examined their long friendship in its exhibit Degas/Cassatt. The catalog was written by Kimberly Jones ISBN 978-3791353647

== Later life ==
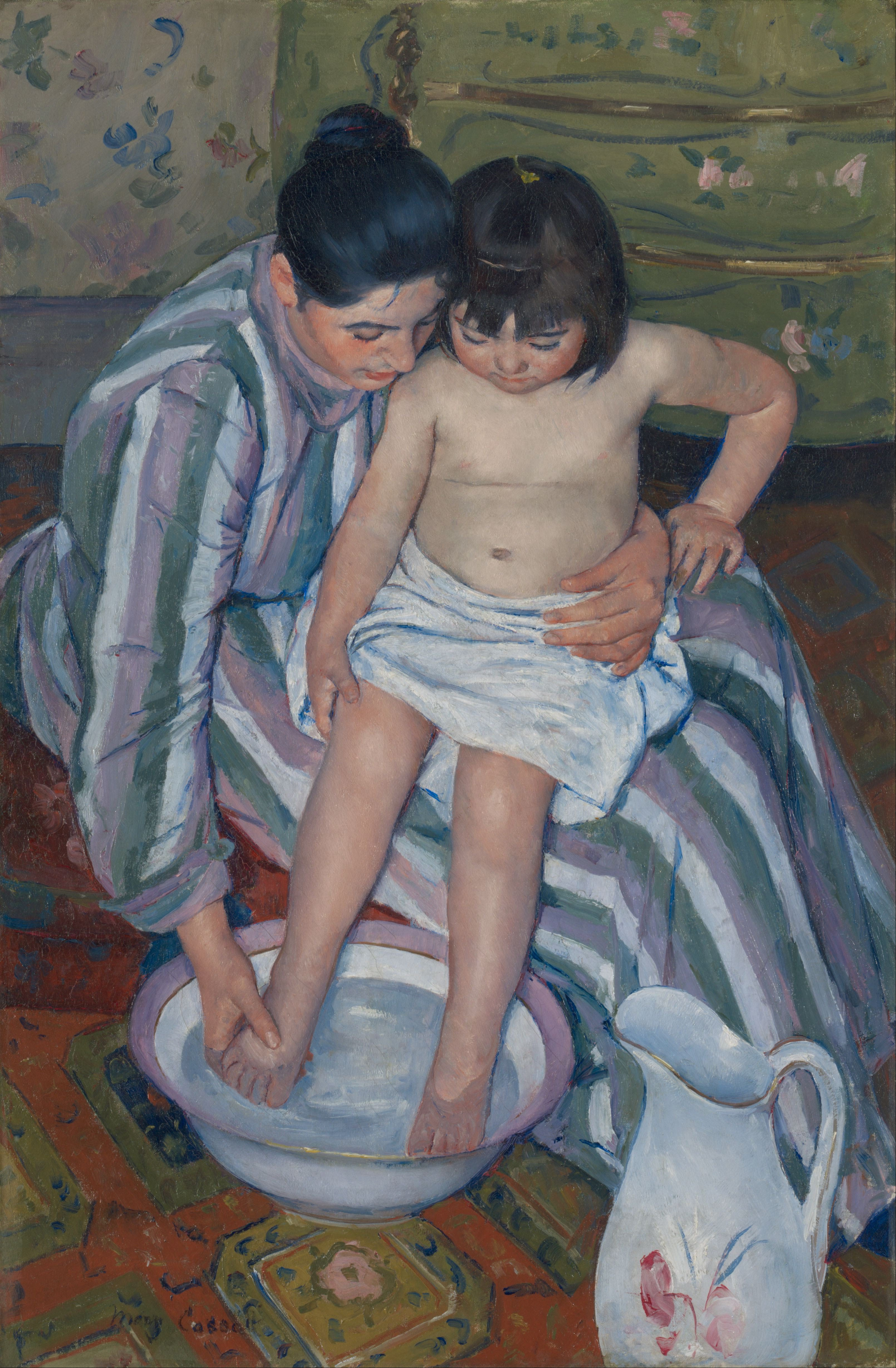
The Child's Bath (The Bath) by Mary Cassatt, 1893, oil on canvas, 39 × 26 in., Art Institute of Chicago

Cassatt's reputation is based on an extensive series of rigorously drawn and tenderly observed paintings and prints on the theme of the mother and child. The earliest dated work on this subject is the drypoint Gardner Held by His Mother (an impression inscribed "Jan/88" is in the New York Public Library), although she had painted a few earlier works on the theme. Some of these works depict her own relatives, friends, or clients, although in her later years she generally used professional models in compositions that are often reminiscent of Italian Renaissance depictions of the Madonna and Child. After 1900, she concentrated almost exclusively on mother-and-child subjects, such as Woman with a Sunflower. Viewers may be surprised to find that despite her focus on portraying mother-child pairs in her portraits, "Cassatt rejected the idea of becoming a wife and mother..."

The 1890s were Cassatt's busiest and most creative period. She had matured considerably and became more diplomatic and less blunt in her opinions. She also became a mentor to young American artists who sought her advice and acted as an intermediary between American collectors and the French art world.

Her friendship with Camille Pissarro became one channel for this mentoring. On 19 November 1891, Cassatt visited Pissarro at his family home in Éragny-sur-Epte, accompanied by a young American woman who wished to seek his advice. The visit is recorded in letters written by Pissarro from Éragny to Octave Mirbeau, now in the Louvre. A few weeks later, Pissarro wrote that three American women “sent by Miss Cassatt” had come to Éragny looking for accommodation so that they could receive his advice; he joked that “it will soon be a colony.” Cassatt later introduced the American painter Lucy A. Bacon to Pissarro, with whom Bacon studied. Although the Impressionist group had disbanded, Cassatt remained in contact with several of its members, including Renoir, Monet and Pissarro.

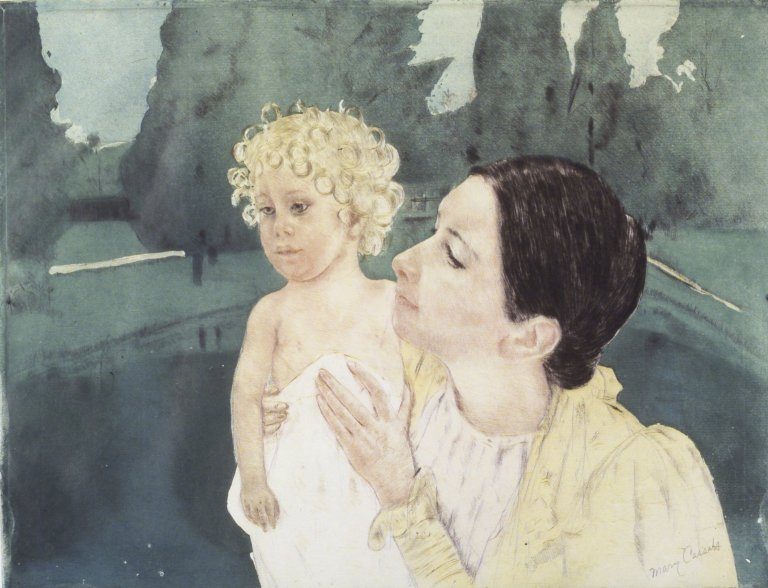
Mary Cassatt, Mother and Child Before a Pool, c. 1898. Drypoint and aquatint on laid paper, Brooklyn Museum

In 1891, she exhibited a series of highly original colored drypoint and aquatint prints, including Woman Bathing and The Coiffure, inspired by the Japanese masters shown in Paris the year before. (See Japonism) Cassatt was attracted to the simplicity and clarity of Japanese design and the skillful use of blocks of color. In her interpretation, she used primarily light, delicate pastel colors and avoided black. Adelyn D. Breeskin, the author of two catalogue raisonnés of Cassatt's work, comments that these colored prints, "now stand as her most original contribution... adding a new chapter to the history of graphic arts...technically, as color prints, they have never been surpassed".

Also in 1891, Chicago socialite Bertha Palmer approached Cassatt to paint a 12' × 58' mural about "Modern Woman" for the Women's Building for the World's Columbian Exposition to be held in 1893. Cassatt completed the project over the next two years while living in France with her mother. The mural was designed as a triptych. The central theme was titled Young Women Plucking the Fruits of Knowledge or Science. The left panel was Young Girls Pursuing Fame and the right panel Arts, Music, Dancing. The mural displays a community of women apart from their relation to men, as accomplished persons in their own right. Palmer considered Cassatt to be an American treasure and could think of no one better to paint a mural at an exposition that was to do so much to focus the world's attention on the status of women. Following the world's fair, the mural came into Bertha Palmer's possession, where it remained as late as 1911, but it disappeared after Palmer's death in 1918. Cassatt made several studies and paintings on themes similar to those in the mural, so it is possible to see her development of those ideas and images. Cassatt also exhibited other paintings in the Exposition.

As the new century arrived, Cassatt served as an advisor to several major art collectors and stipulated that they eventually donate their purchases to American art museums. In recognition of her contributions to the arts, France awarded her the Légion d'honneur in 1904. Although instrumental in advising American collectors, recognition of her art came more slowly in the United States. Even among her family members back in America, she received little recognition and was totally overshadowed by her famous brother.

Mary Cassatt's brother, Alexander Cassatt, was president of the Pennsylvania Railroad from 1899 until his death in 1906. She was shaken, as they had been close, but she continued to be very productive in the years leading up to 1910. An increasing sentimentality is apparent in her work of the 1900s; her work was popular with the public and the critics, but she was no longer breaking new ground, and her Impressionist colleagues who once provided stimulation and criticism were dying. She was hostile to such new developments in art as post-Impressionism, Fauvism and Cubism. Two of her works appeared in the Armory Show of 1913, both images of a mother and child.

A trip to Egypt in 1910 impressed Cassatt with the beauty of its ancient art, but was followed by a crisis of creativity; not only had the trip exhausted her, but she declared herself "crushed by the strength of this Art", saying, "I fought against it but it conquered, it is surely the greatest Art the past has left us ... how are my feeble hands to ever paint the effect on me." Diagnosed with diabetes, rheumatism, neuralgia, and cataracts in 1911, she did not slow down, but after 1914, she was forced to stop painting as she became almost blind. In 1925 she was featured on 32nd Annual Exhibition of American Art at the Cincinnati Art Museum, together with Louise Woodroofe, Childe Hassam and Robert Henri.

Cassatt died on June 14, 1926, at Château de Beaufresne, near Paris, and was buried in the family vault at Le Mesnil-Théribus, France.

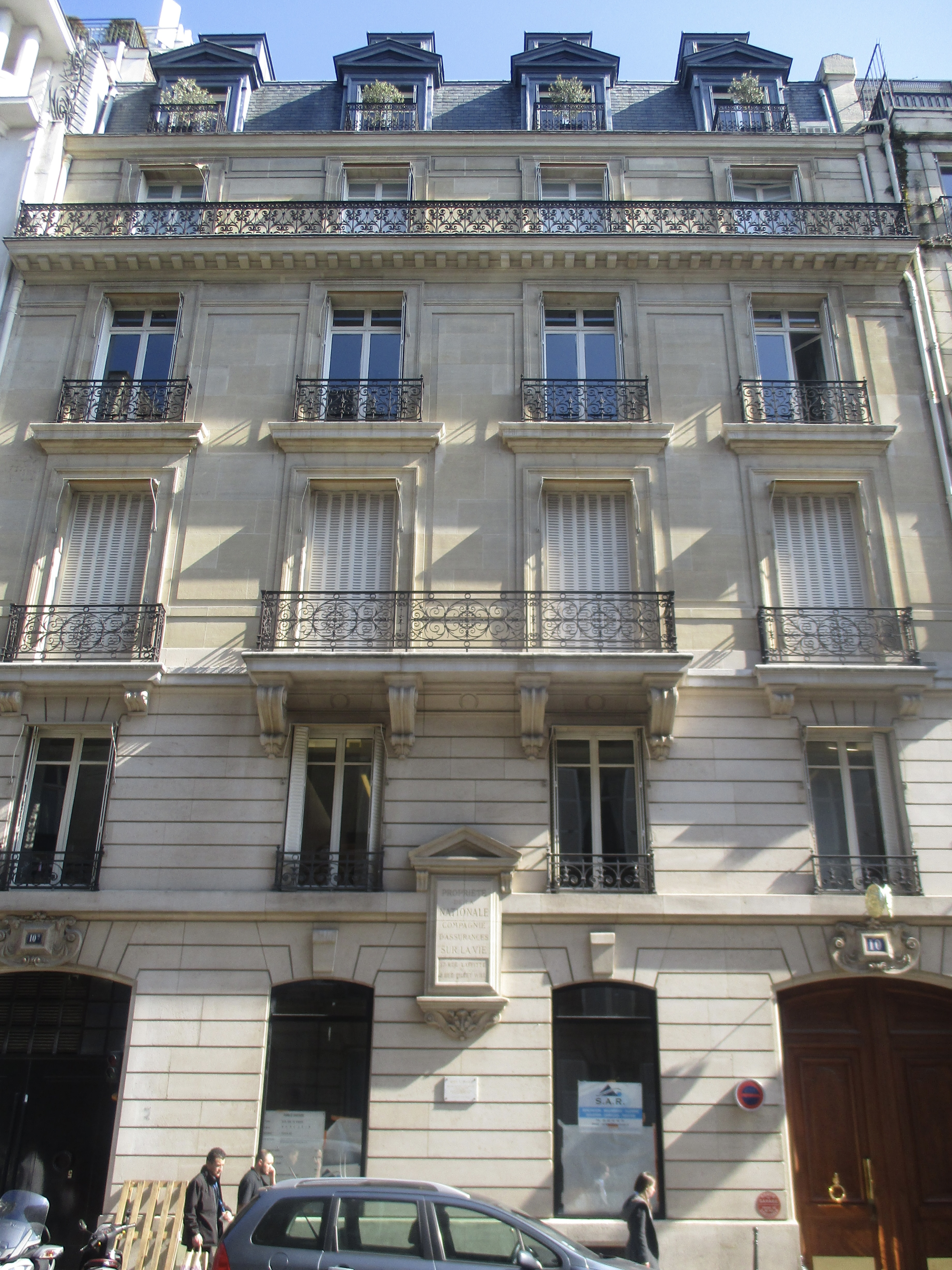
House of rue de Marignan in Paris, where Mary Cassatt lived from 1887 until her death

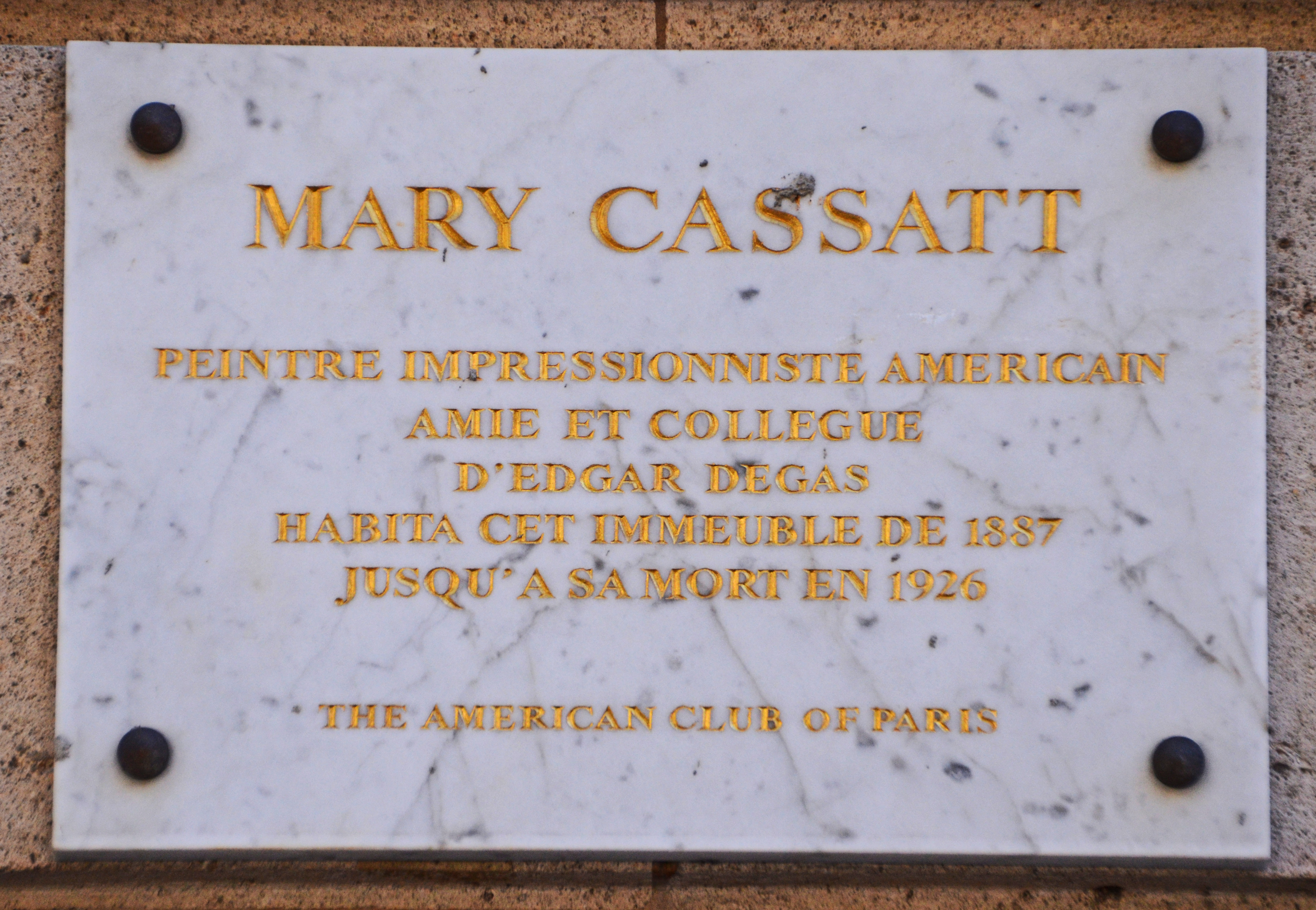
Memorial on the facade of 10 rue de Marignan

== Legacy ==
- Mary Cassatt inspired many Canadian women artists who were members of the Beaver Hall Group.
- The SS Mary Cassatt was a World War II Liberty ship, launched May 16, 1943.
- A quartet of young Juilliard string musicians formed the all-female Cassatt Quartet in 1985, named in honor of the painter. In 2009, the award-winning group recorded String Quartets Nos. 1–3 (Cassatt String Quartet) by composer Dan Welcher; the 3rd quartet on the album was written inspired by the work of Mary Cassatt as well.
- In 1966, Cassatt's painting The Boating Party was reproduced on a US postage stamp. Later she was honored by the United States Postal Service with a 23-cent Great Americans series postage stamp.
- In 1973, Cassatt was inducted into the National Women's Hall of Fame.
- In 2003, four of her paintings – Young Mother (1888), Children Playing on the Beach (1884), On a Balcony (1878/79) and Child in a Straw Hat (c. 1886) – were reproduced on the third issue in the American Treasures stamp series.
- On May 22, 2009, she was honored by a Google Doodle in recognition of her birthday.
- Cassatt's paintings have sold for as much as $4 million, the record price of $4,072,500 being set in 1996 at Christie's, New York, for In the Box.
- A public garden in the 12th arrondissement of Paris is named 'Jardin Mary Cassatt' in her memory.
- In 2026, the Art Institute of Chicago presented Mary Cassatt: After Impressionism, an exhibition marking the centenary of Cassatt's death and examining her work beyond her Impressionist period.

== Gallery ==
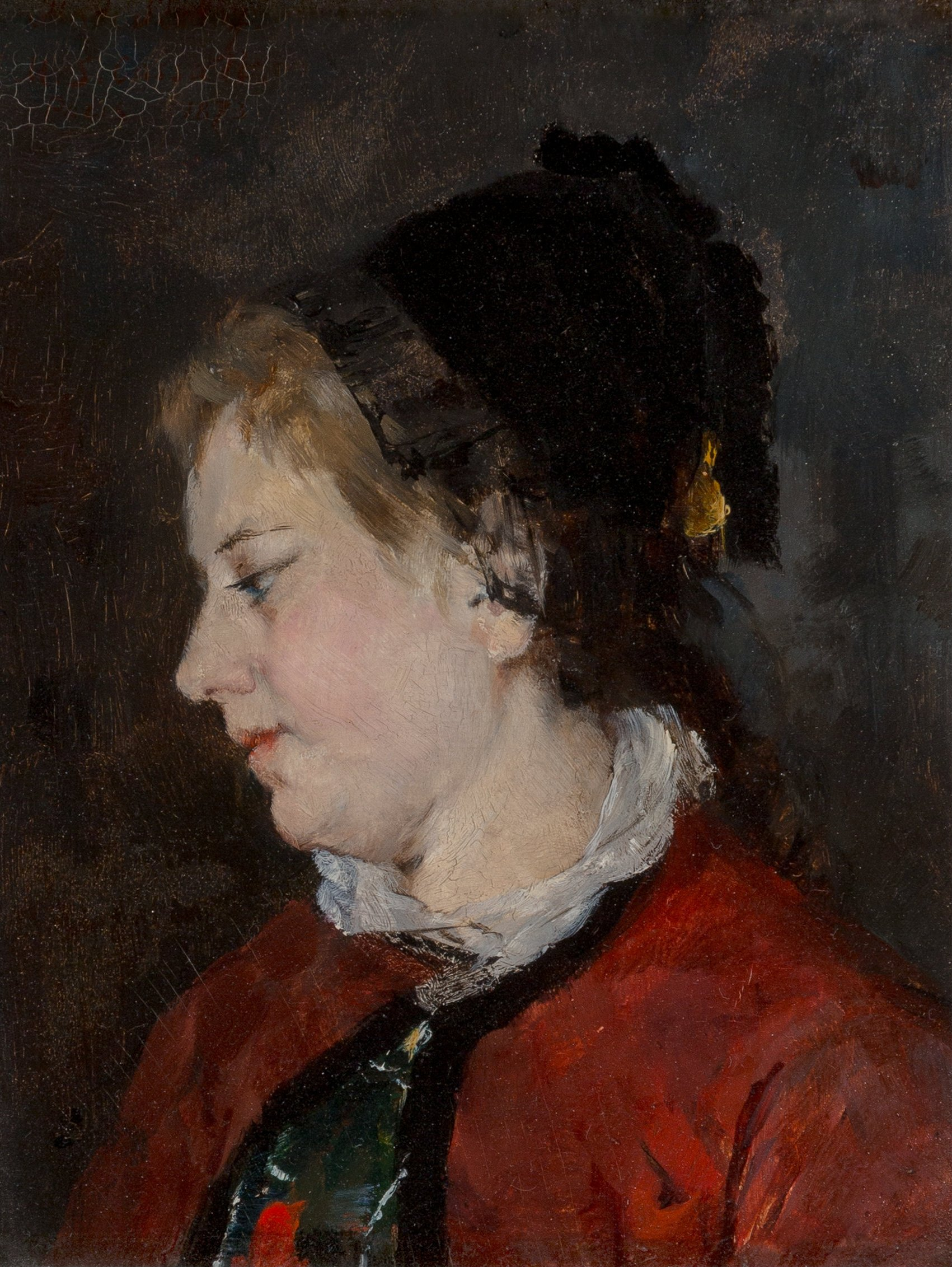
Portrait of Madame Sisley (1873)

The Reader (1877), Crystal Bridges Museum of American Art

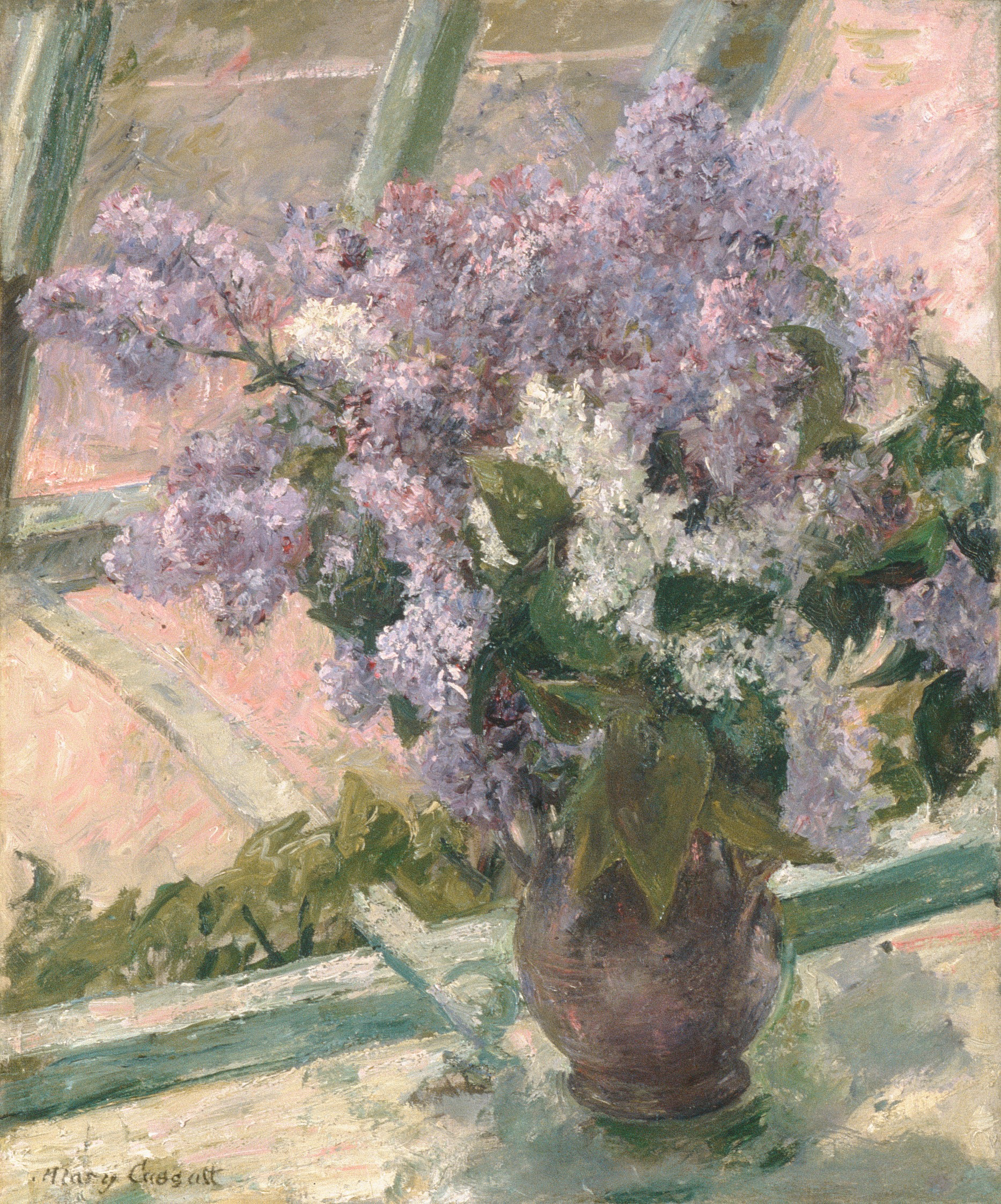
Lilacs in a Window (1879)

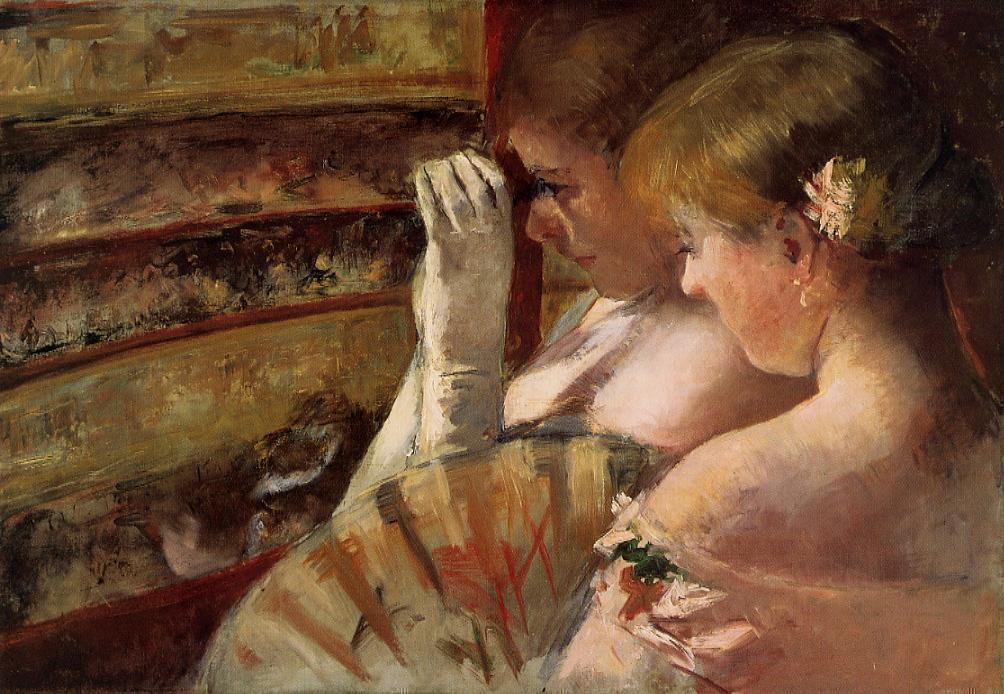
In the Box (1879)

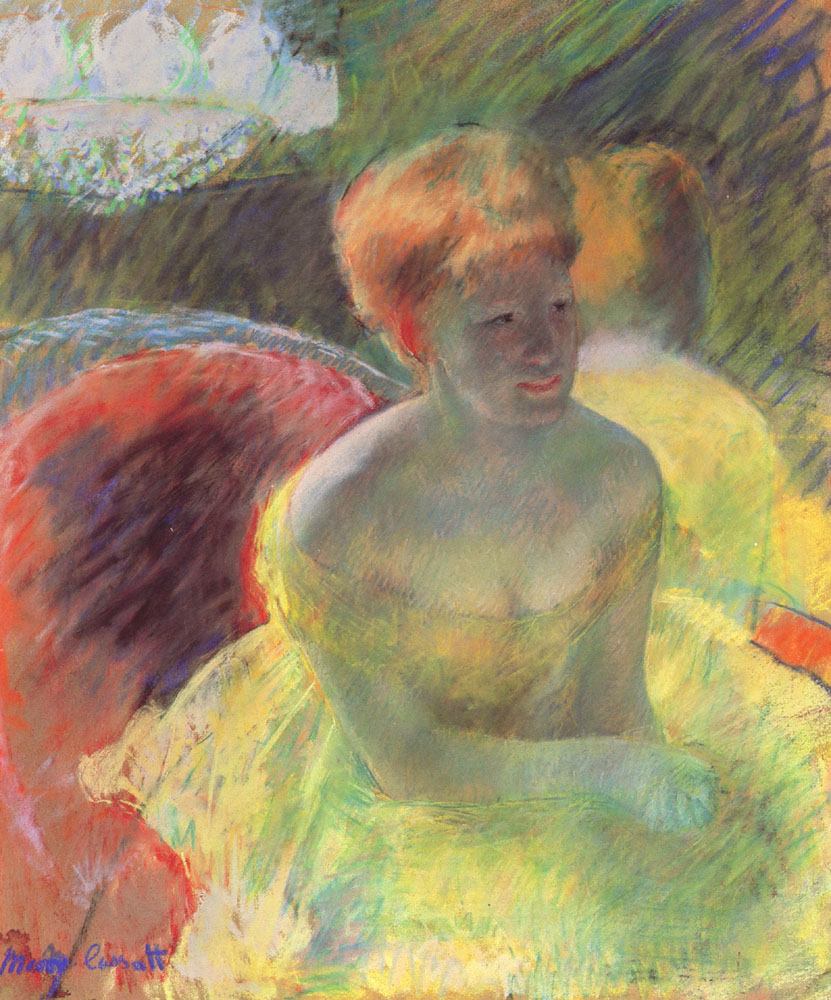
Lydia Leaning on Her Arms, Seated in Loge (1879)

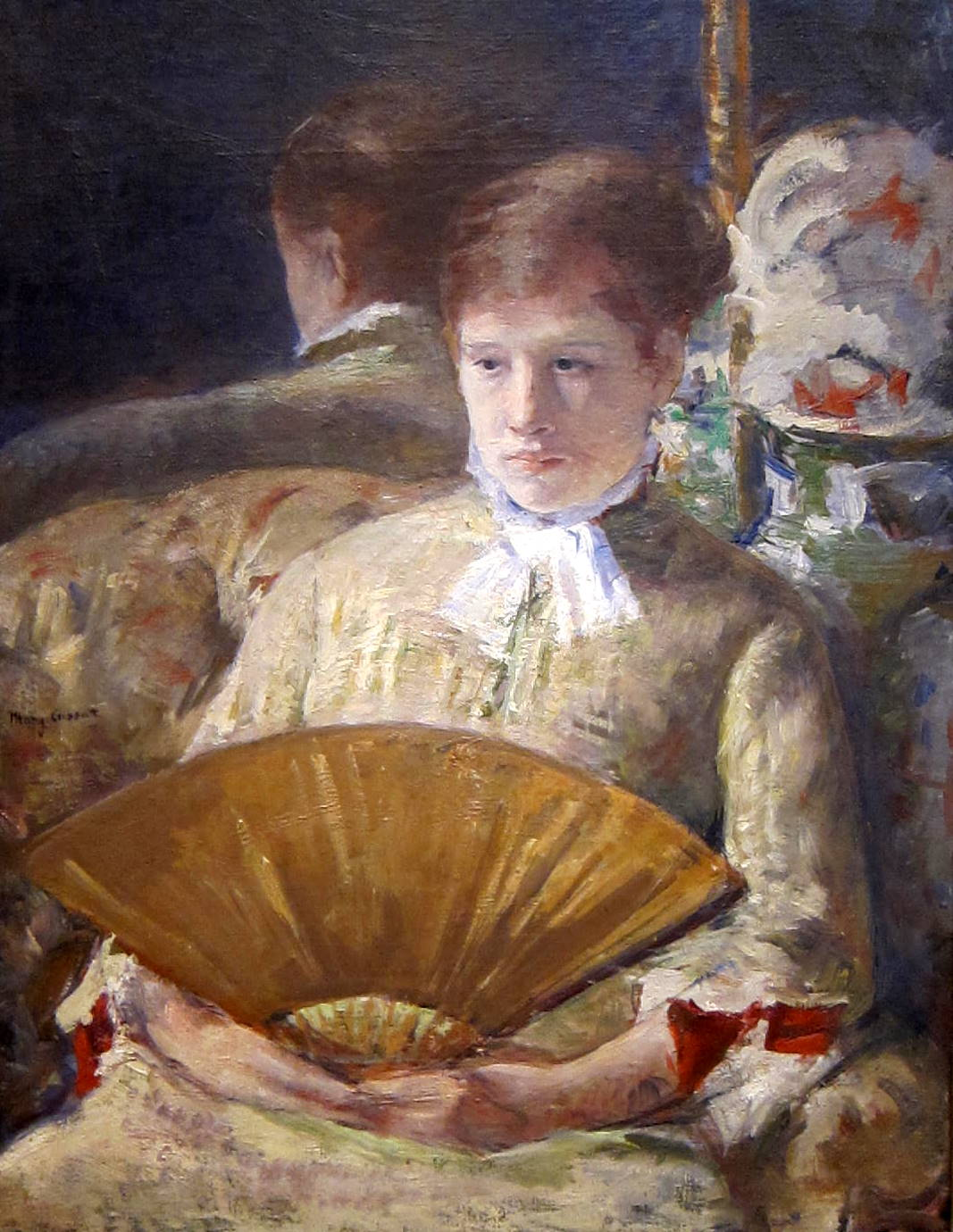
Miss Mary Ellison (1880)

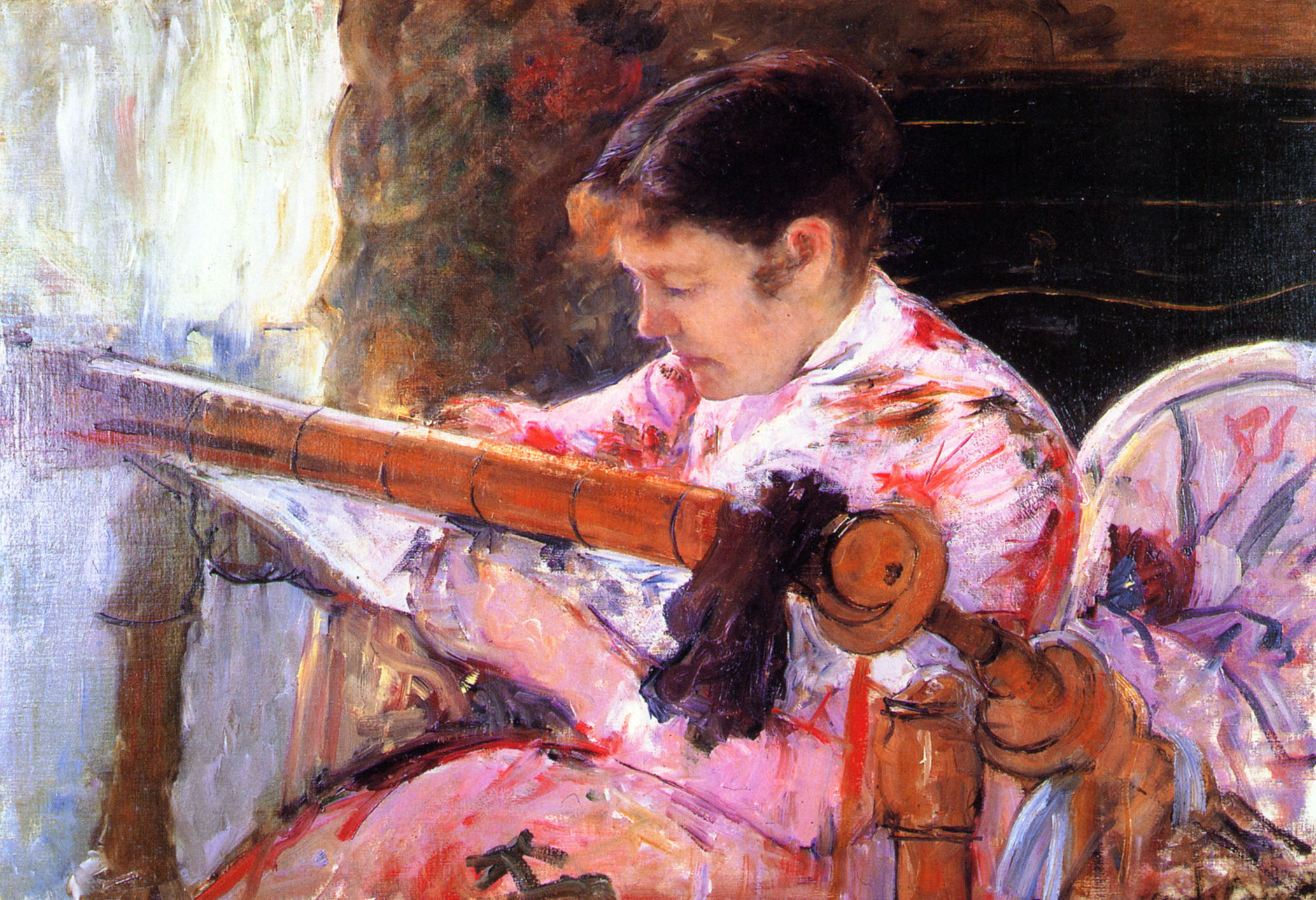
Lydia at the Tapestry Loom (c. 1881)

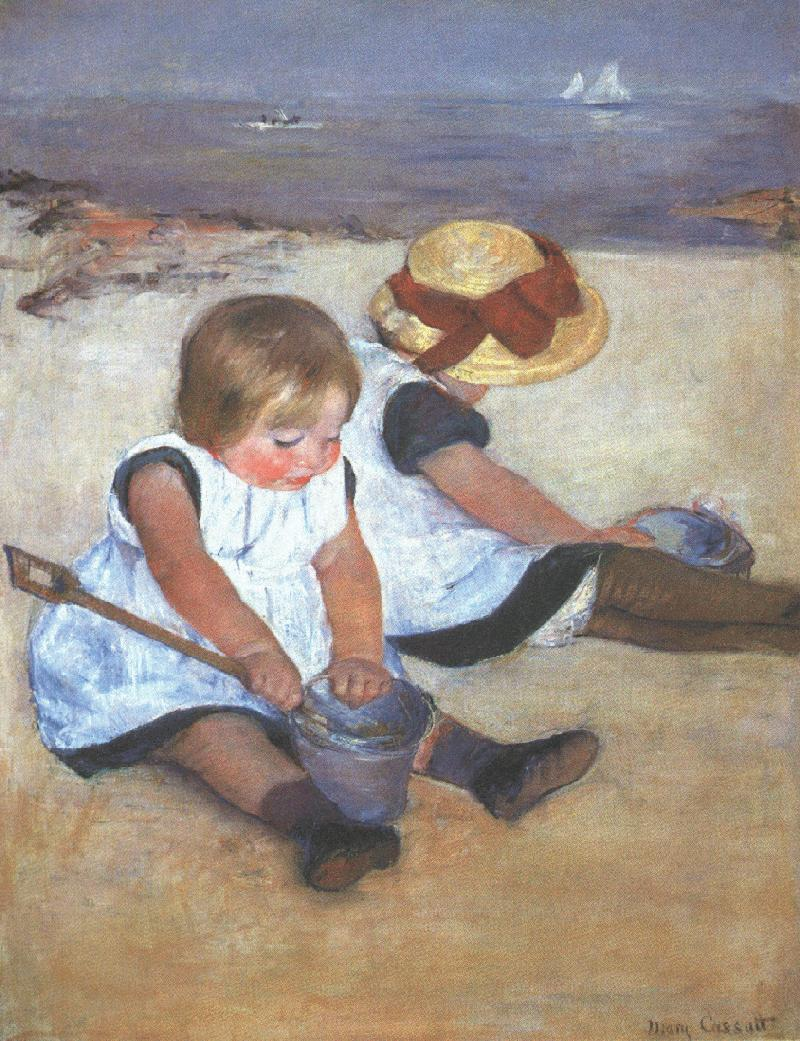
Children Playing on the Beach (1884)

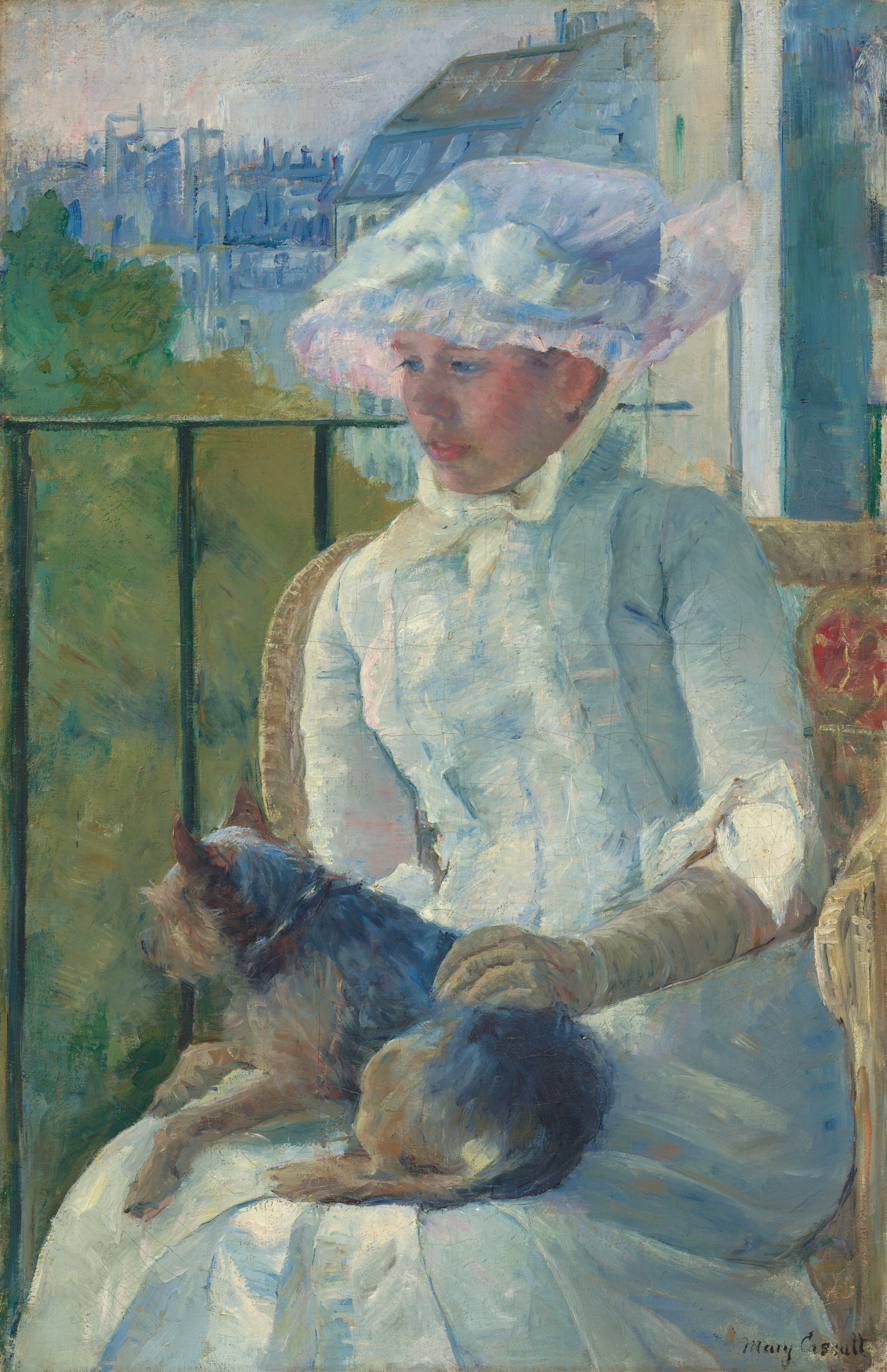
Young Girl at a Window (c. 1883–1884), National Gallery of Art

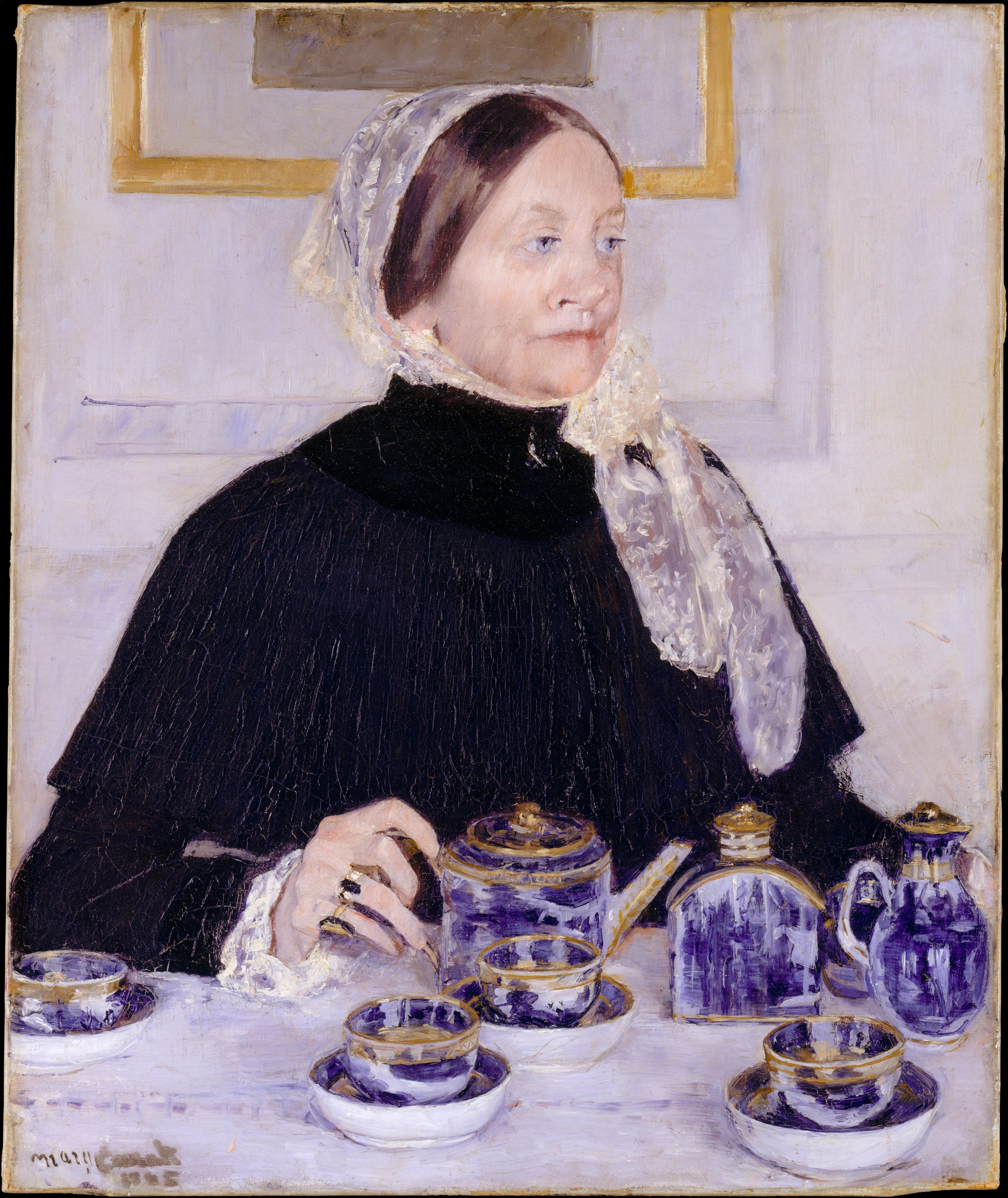
Lady at the Tea Table (1883–1885), Metropolitan Museum of Art

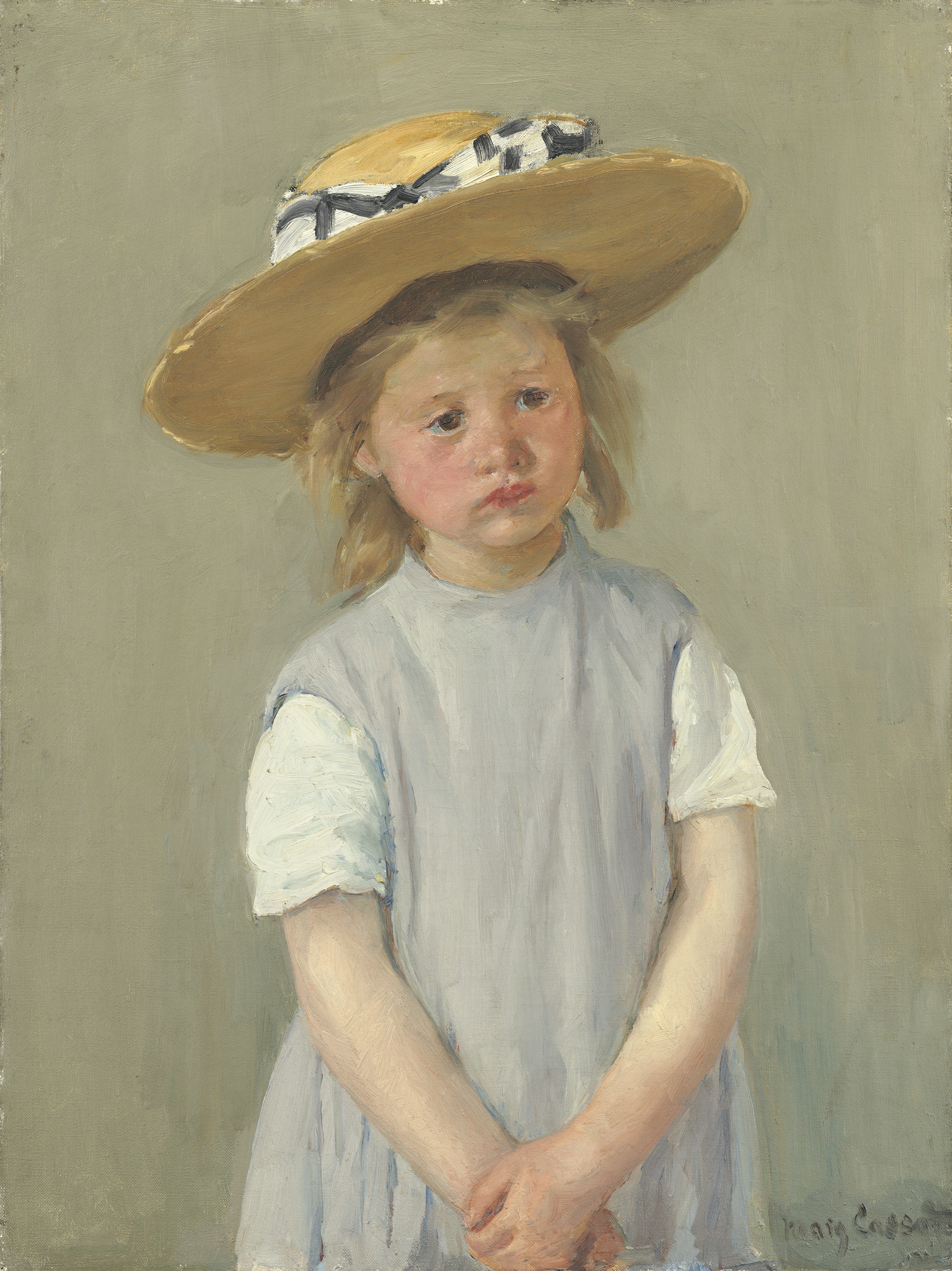
Child in Straw Hat (1886)

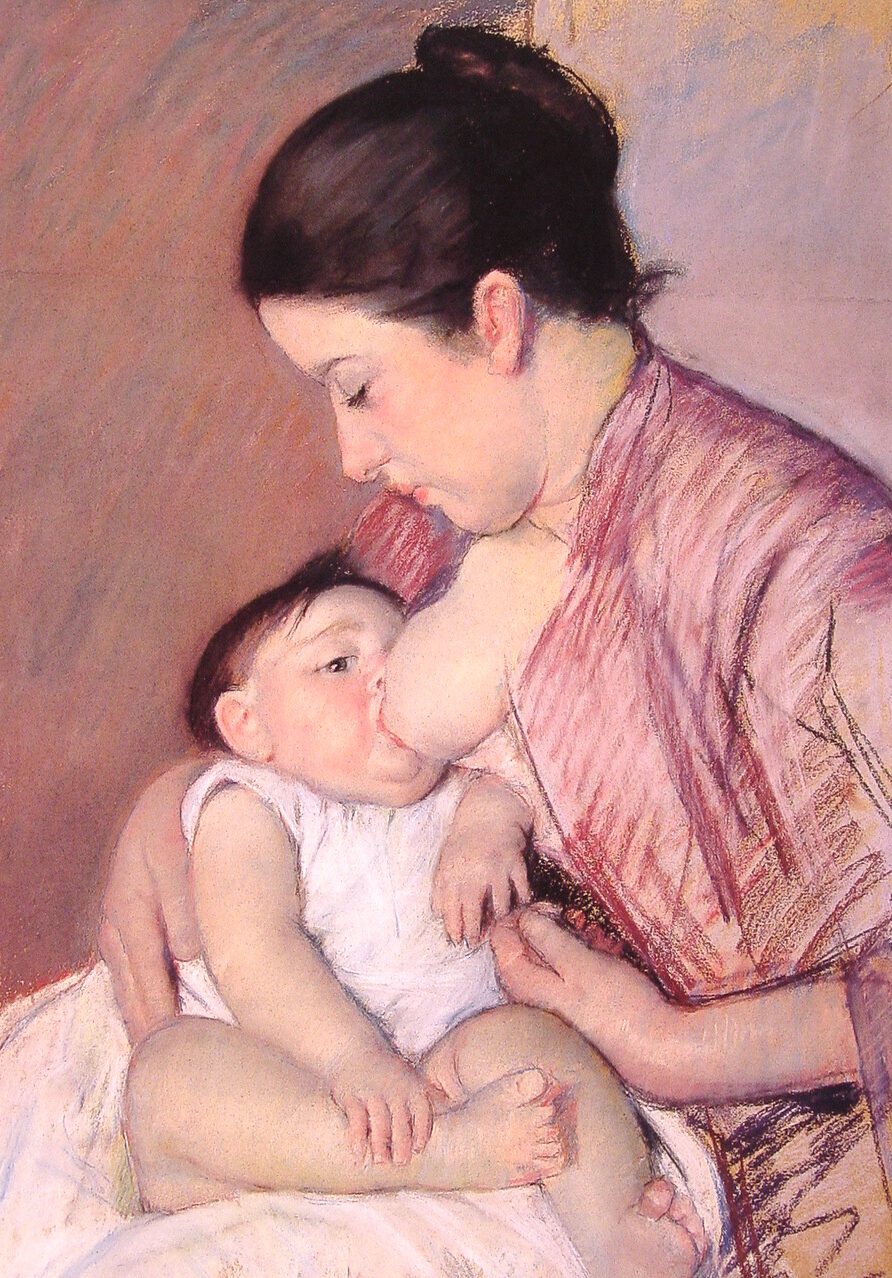
Maternité (1890), pastel

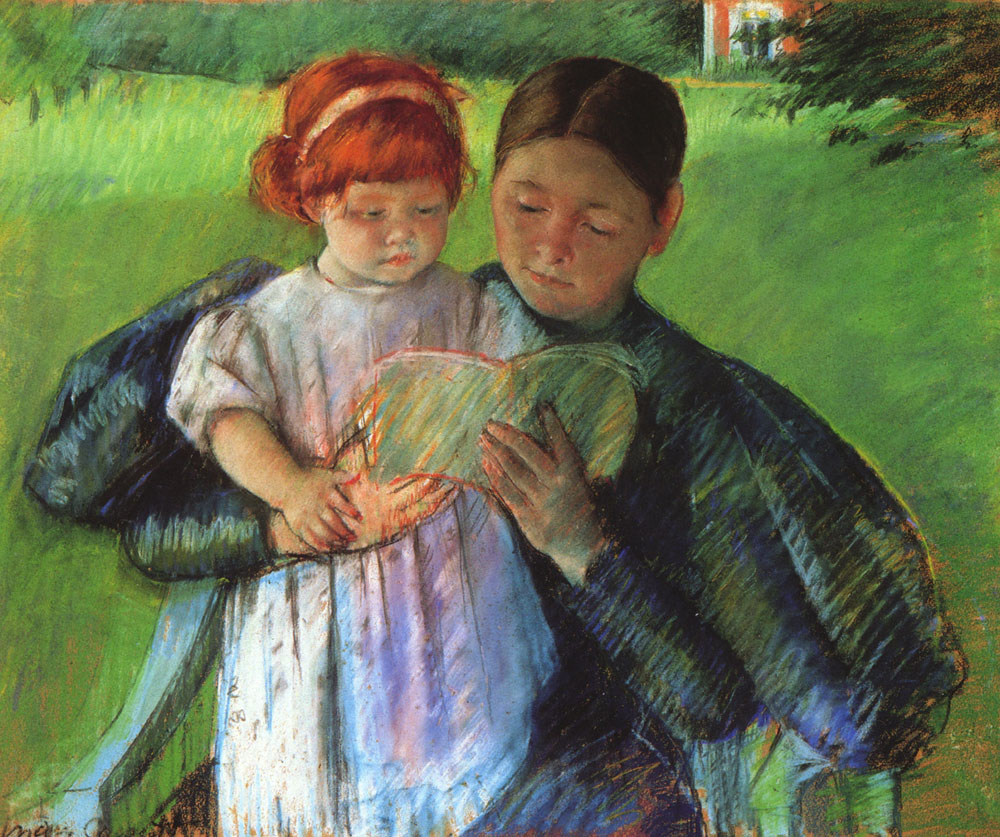
Nurse Reading to a Little Girl (1895), pastel

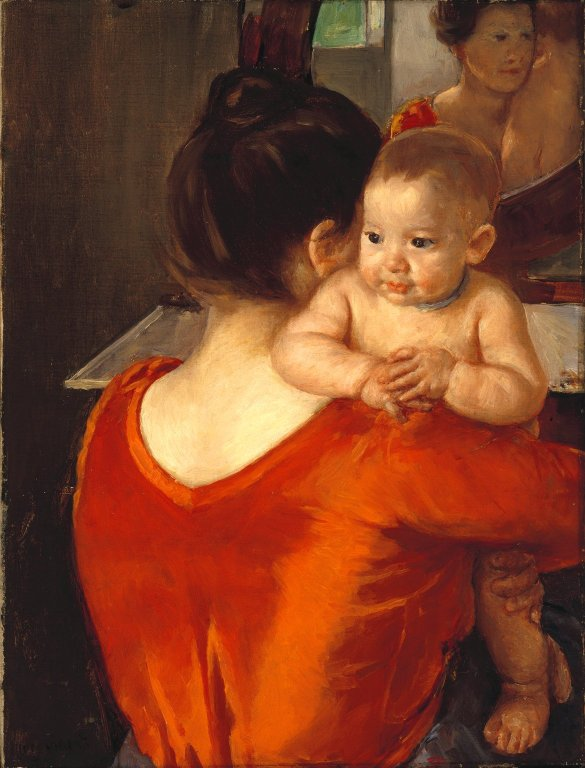
Woman in a Red Bodice and Her Child (c. 1896), Brooklyn Museum

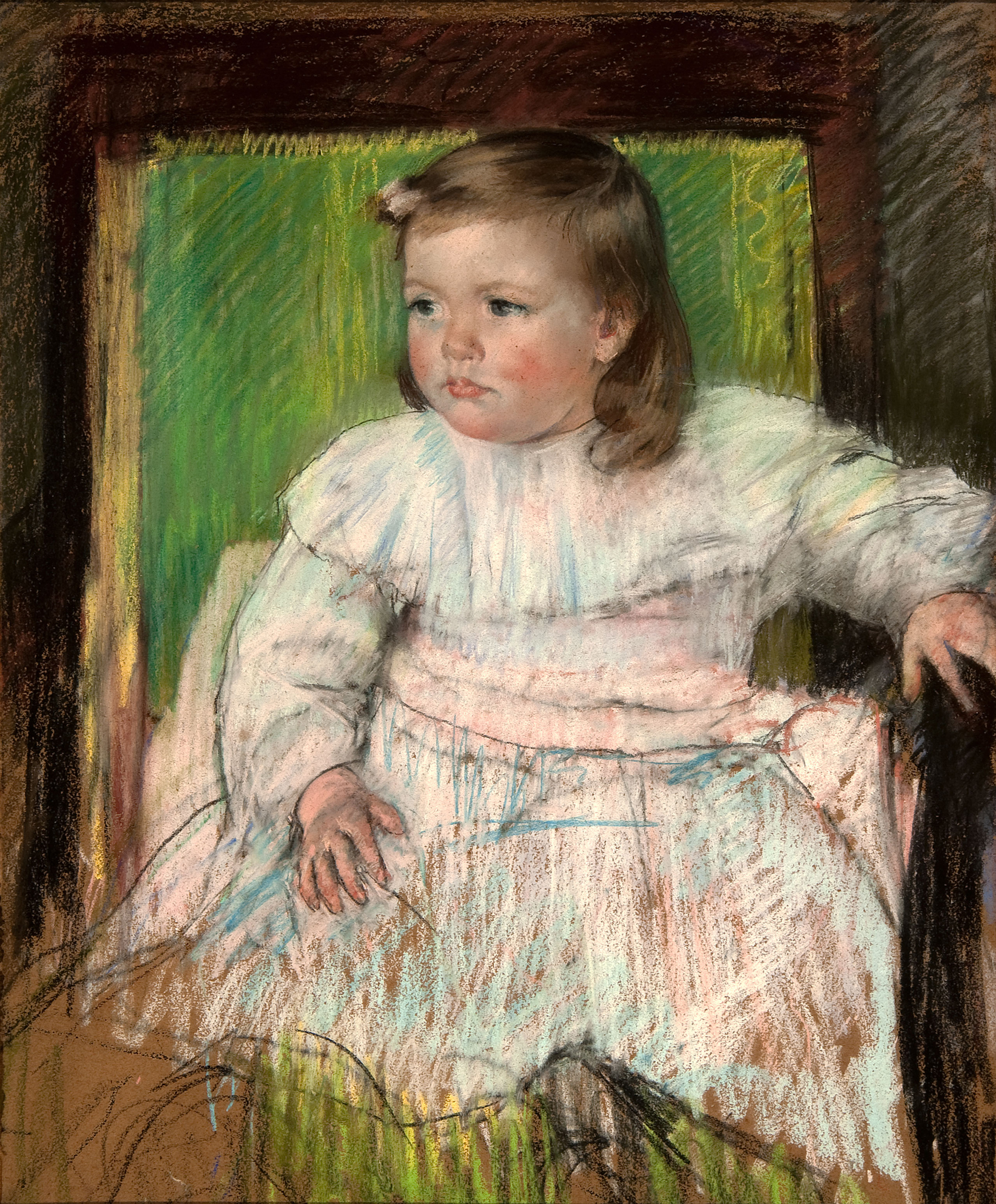
The Pink Sash (1898), pastel

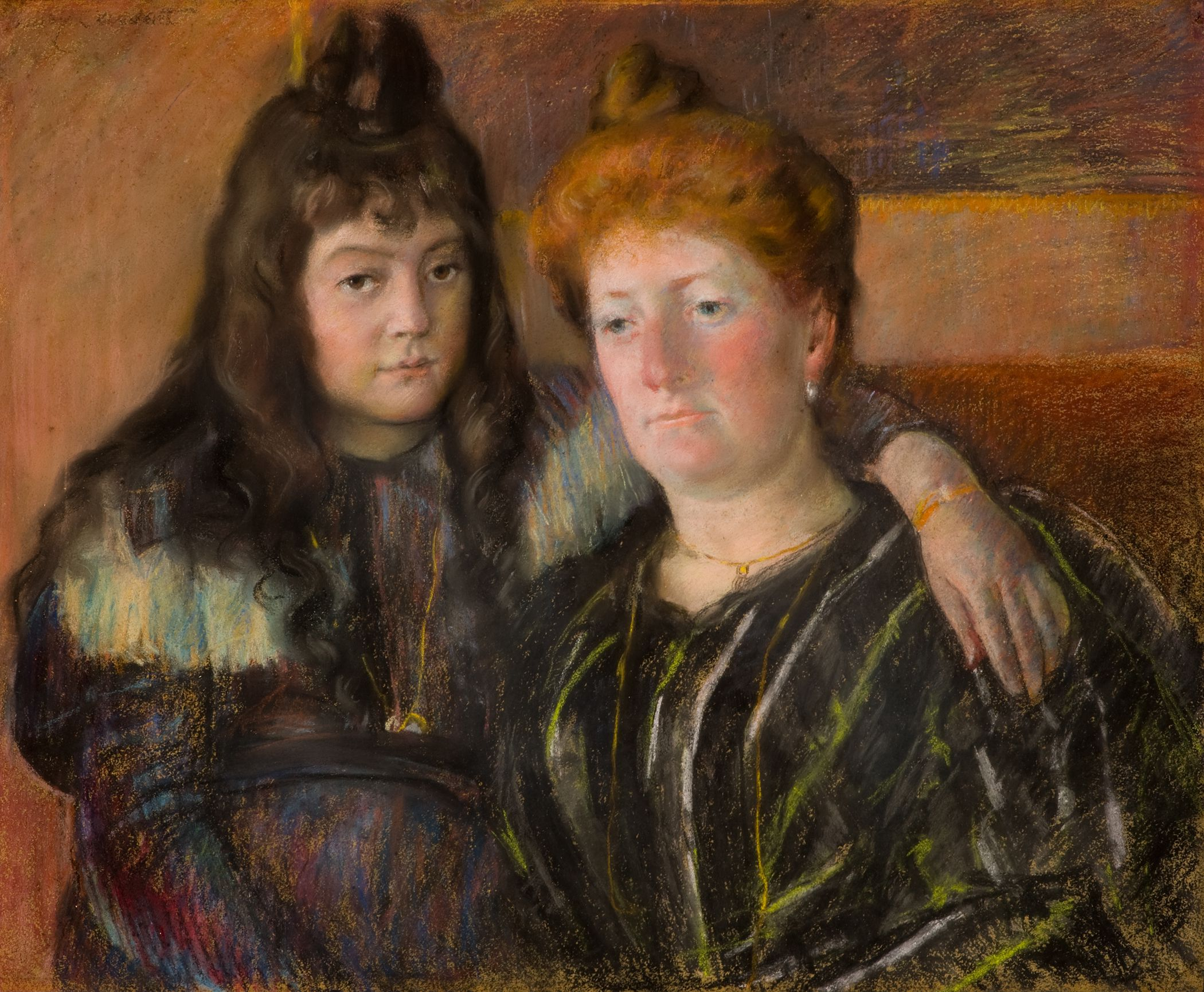
Madame Gaillard and Her Daughter Marie-Thérèse (1899), pastel, Reynolda House Museum of American Art

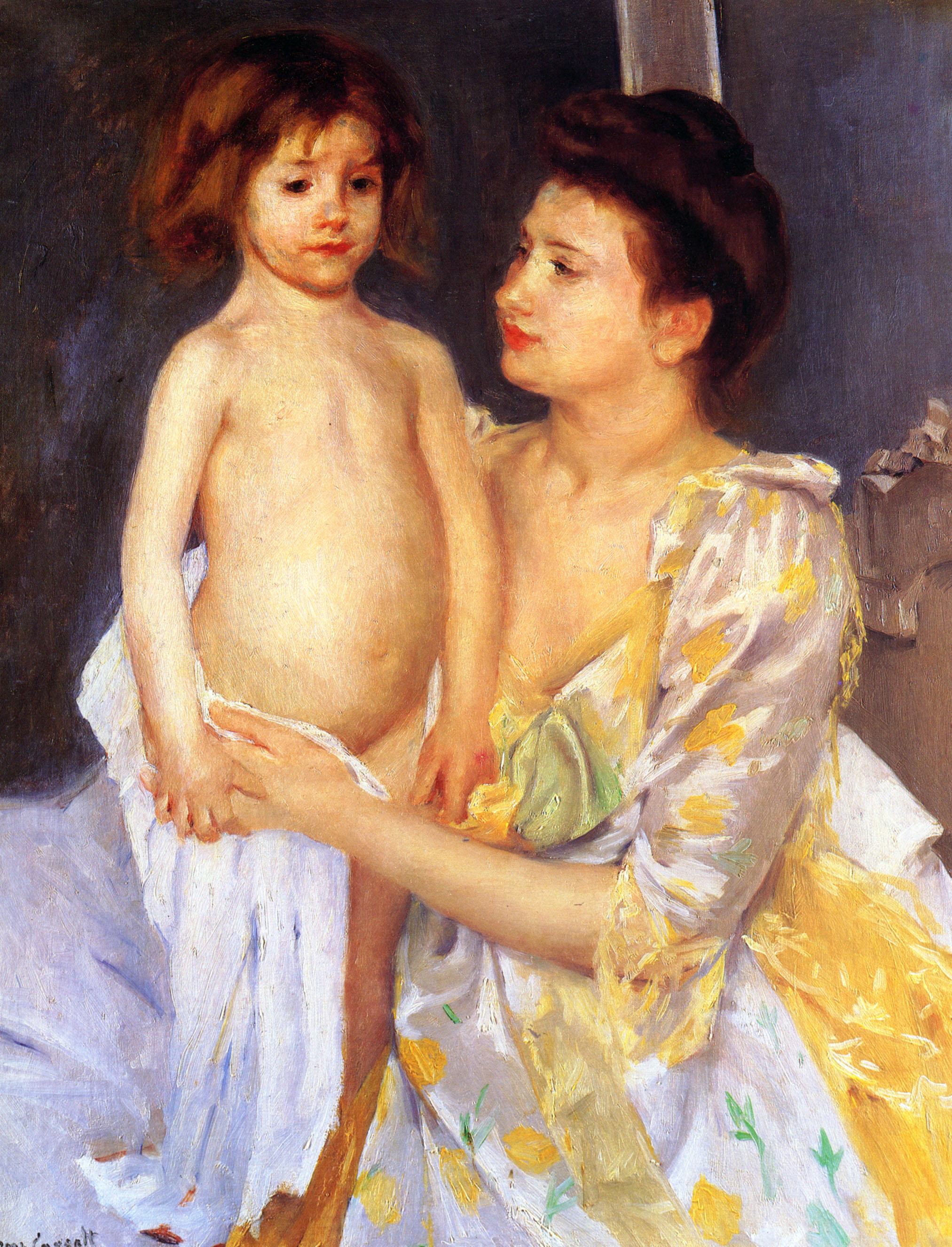
Jules Being Dried by His Mother (1900)

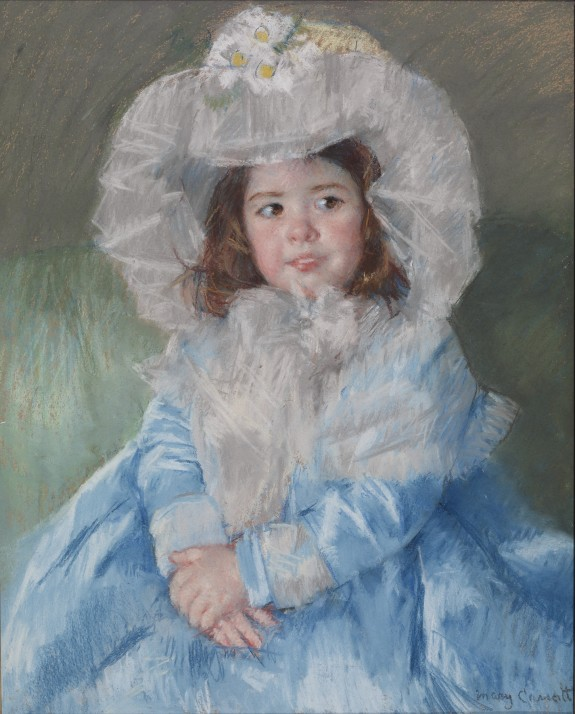
Margot in Blue (1903), pastel, Walters Art Museum

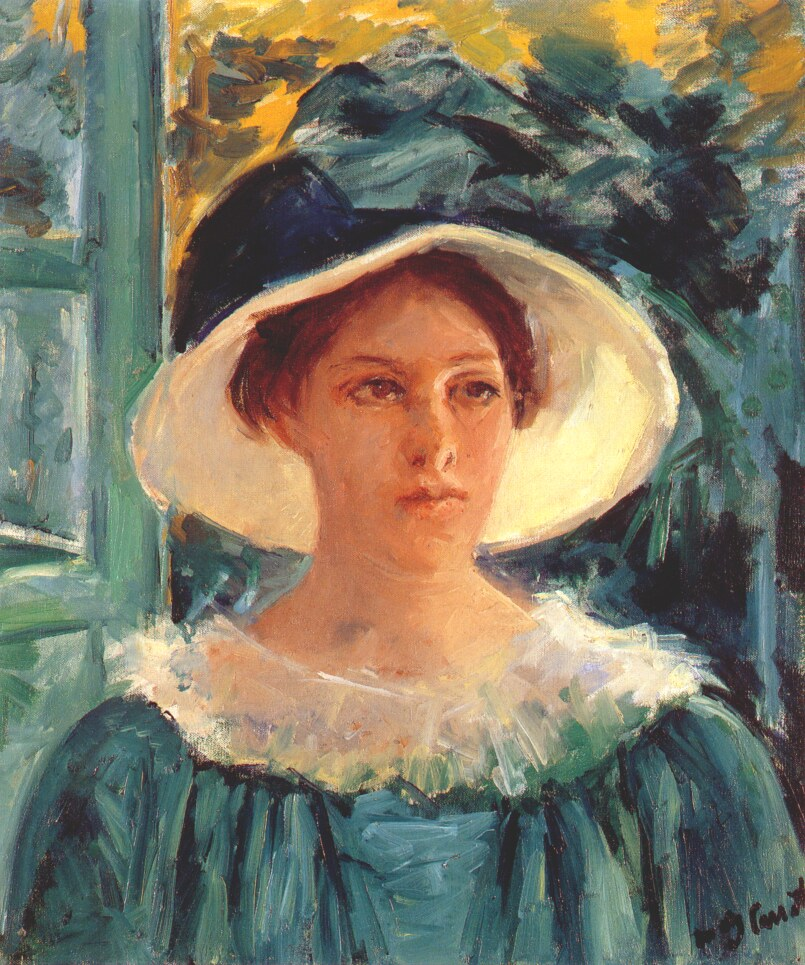
Young Woman in Green, Outdoors in the Sun (1914)

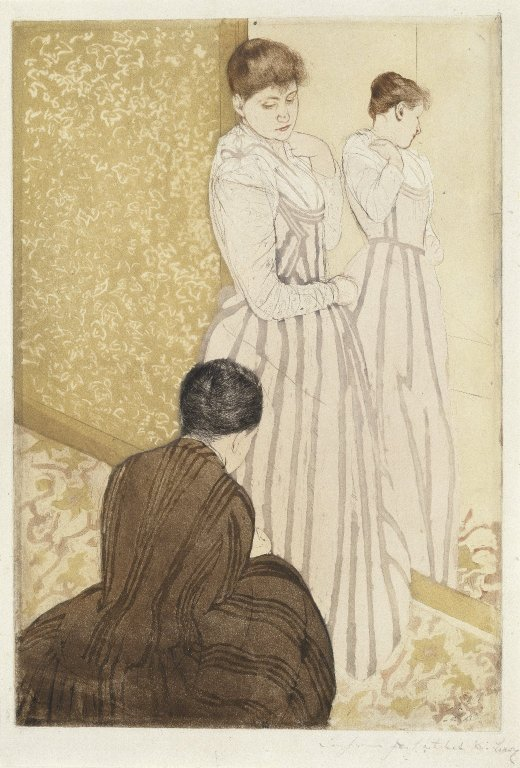
The Fitting (c. 1890), drypoint and aquatint, Brooklyn Museum

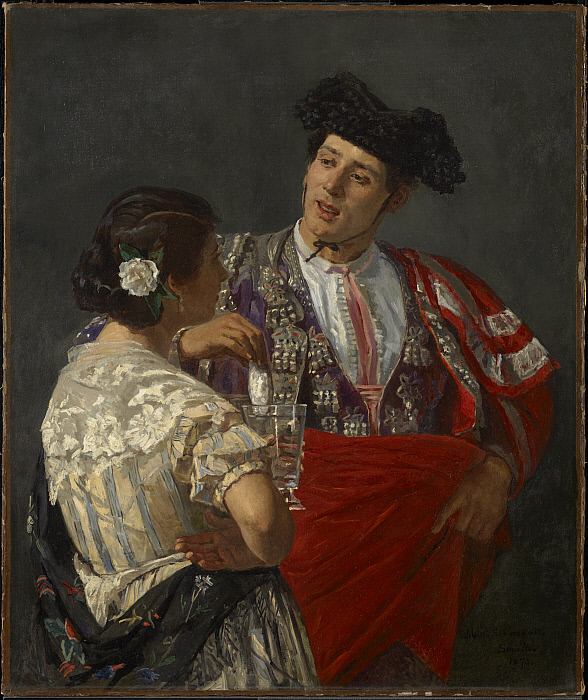
Offering the Panal to the Bullfighter (1873), oil on canvas, Clark Art Institute

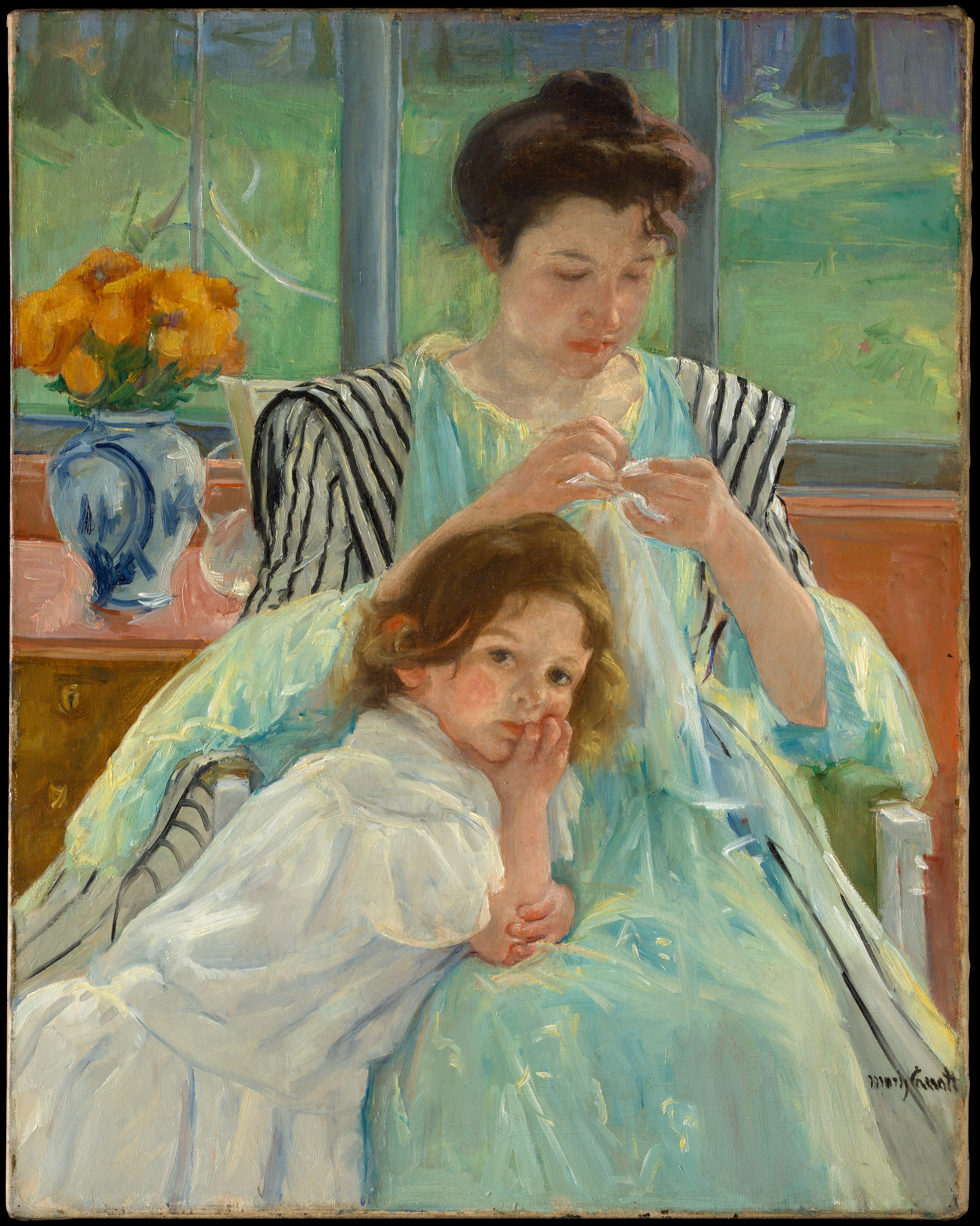
Young Mother Sewing (1900), oil on canvas, Metropolitan Museum of Art

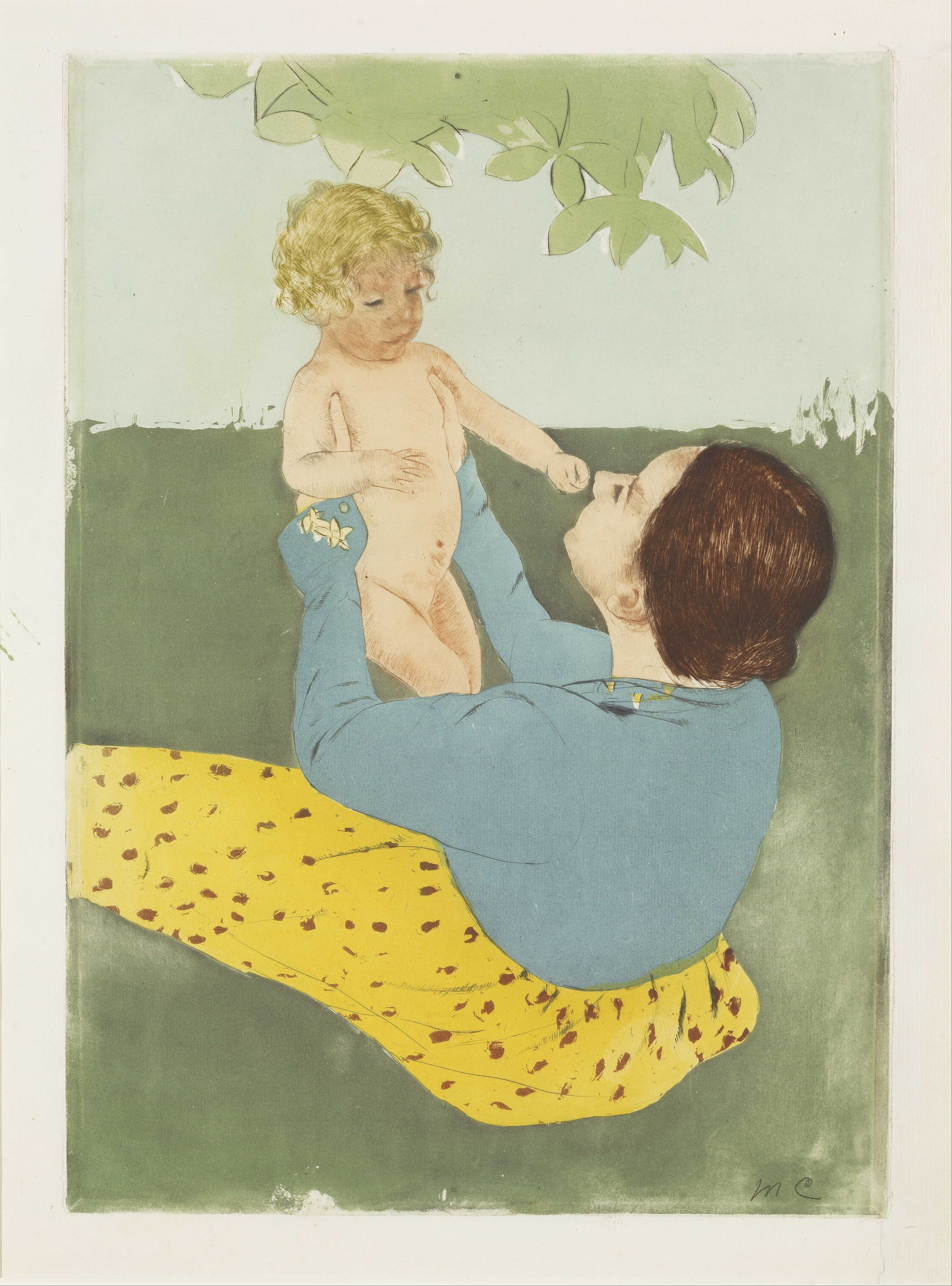
Under the Horse Chestnut Tree by Mary Cassatt, 1898, drypoint and aquatint print, 19 × 15 in., Museum of Fine Arts, Houston.

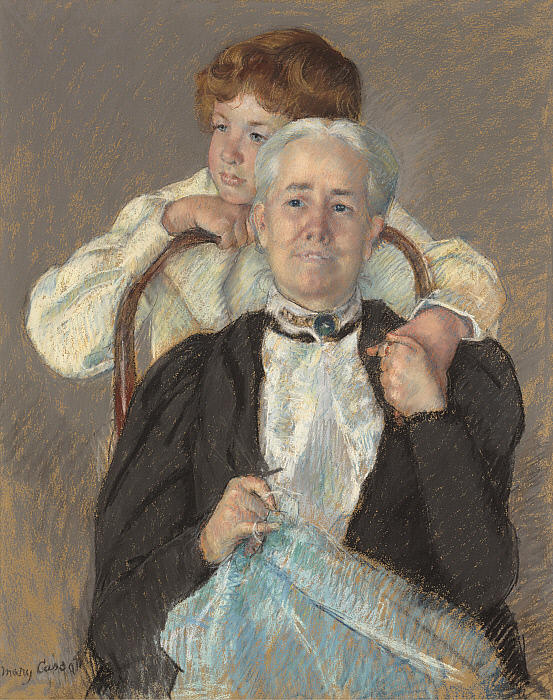
Portrait of Mrs. Cyrus J. Lawrence with her Grandson R. Lawrence Oakley (1898), pastel on tan paper, Clark Art Institute

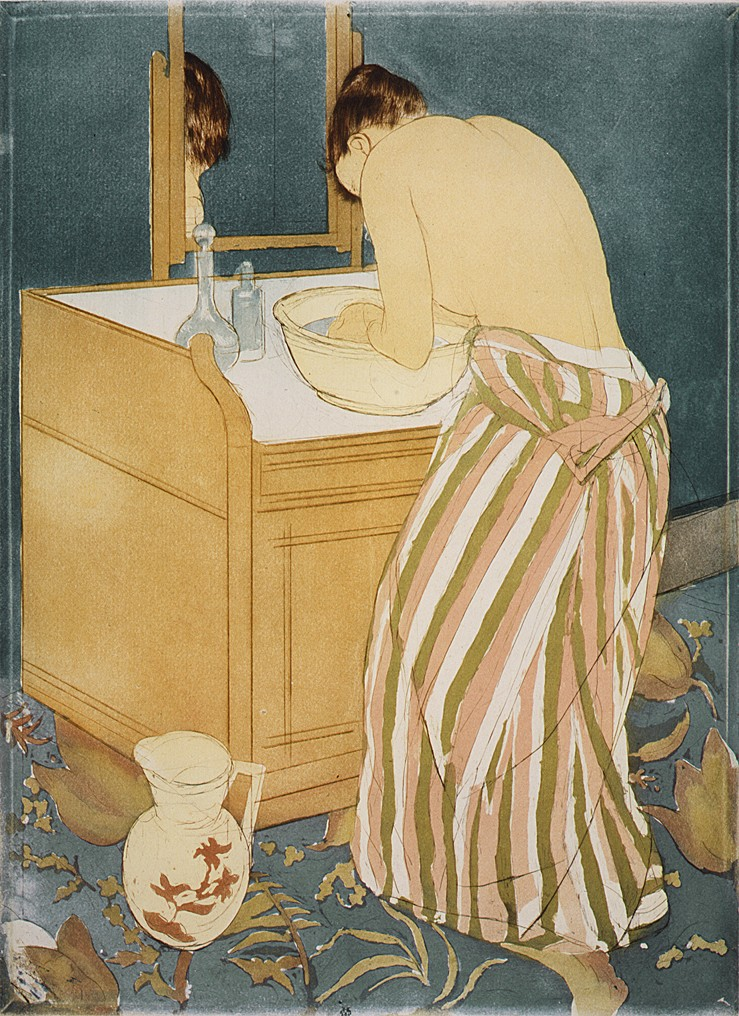
Woman Bathing (La Toilette) by Mary Cassatt, 1890–91, Drypoint and aquatint print, Metropolitan Museum of Art.

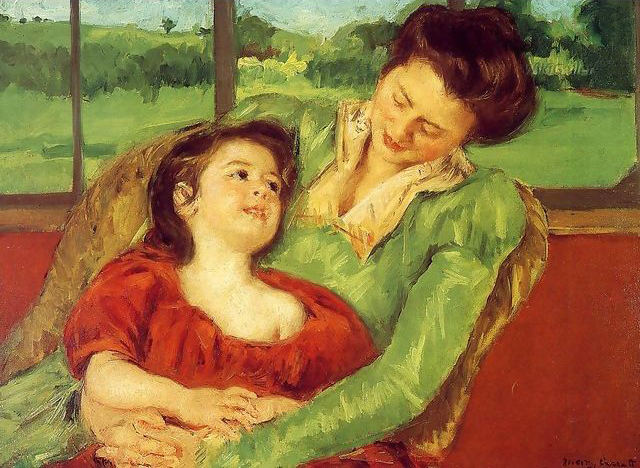
Mère et enfant (Reine Lefebre and Margot before a Window), c. 1902

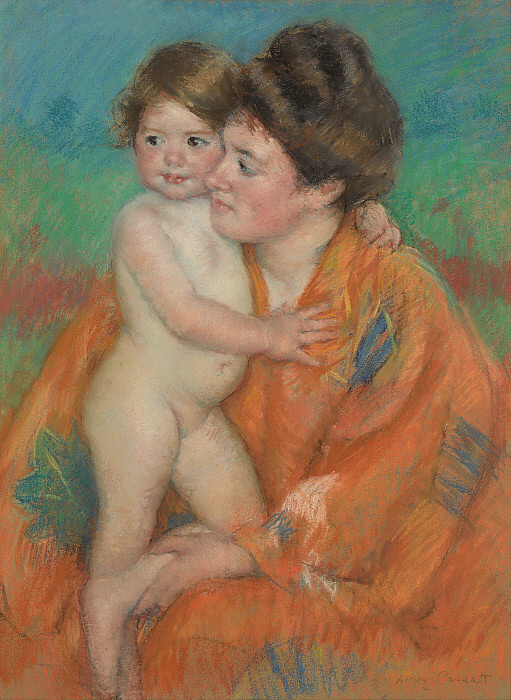
Woman with Baby (1902), pastel on gray paper, Clark Art Institute

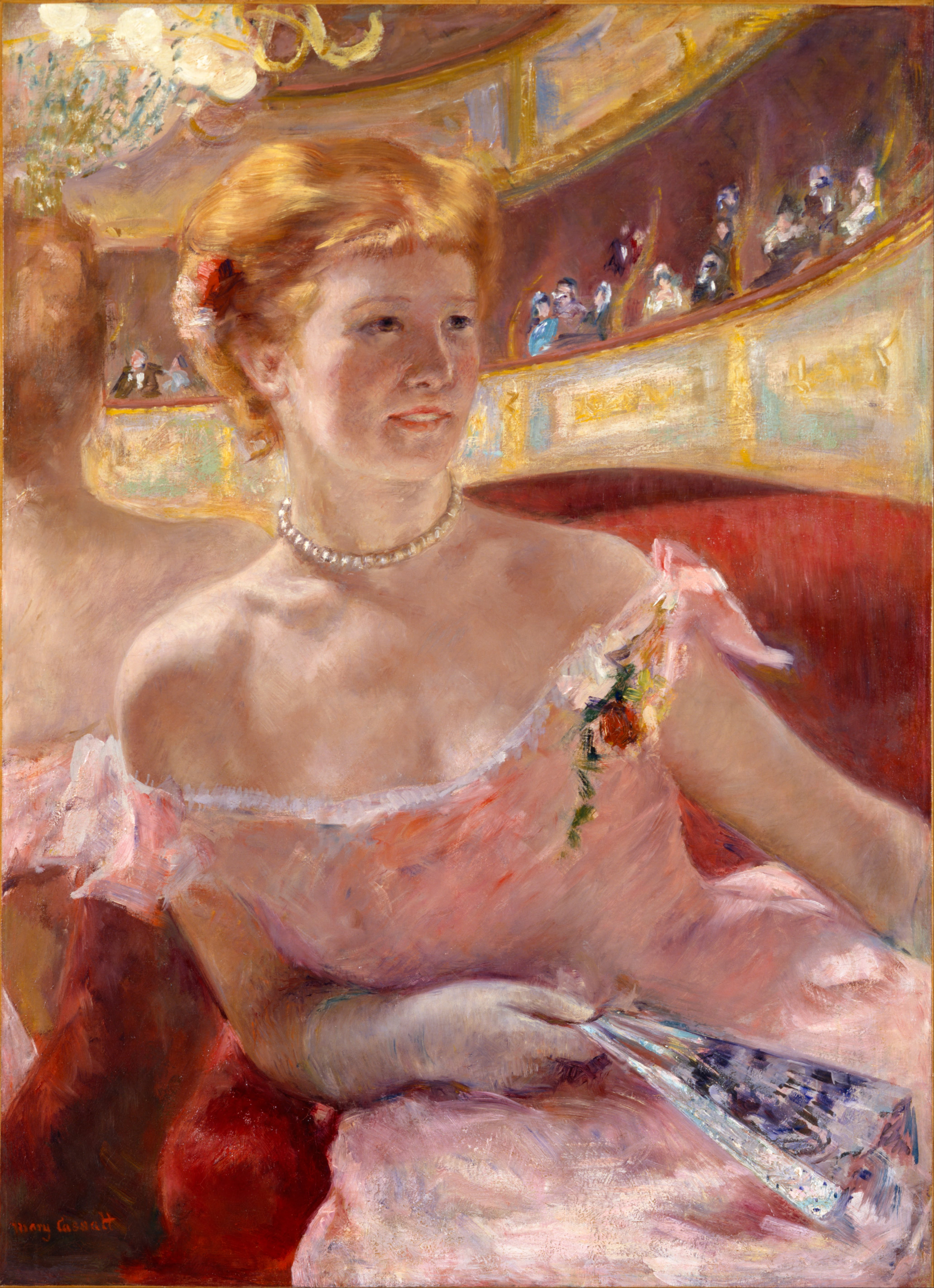
Woman with a Pearl Necklace in a Loge, 1879, oil on canvas, 81 × 60 cm, Philadelphia Museum of Art

== Film ==
- Mary Cassatt: Painting the Modern Woman. Director: Ali Ray, UK, 93 minutes, 2023
