= Gardner (Cassatt) Held by His Mother =

Print by Mary Cassatt

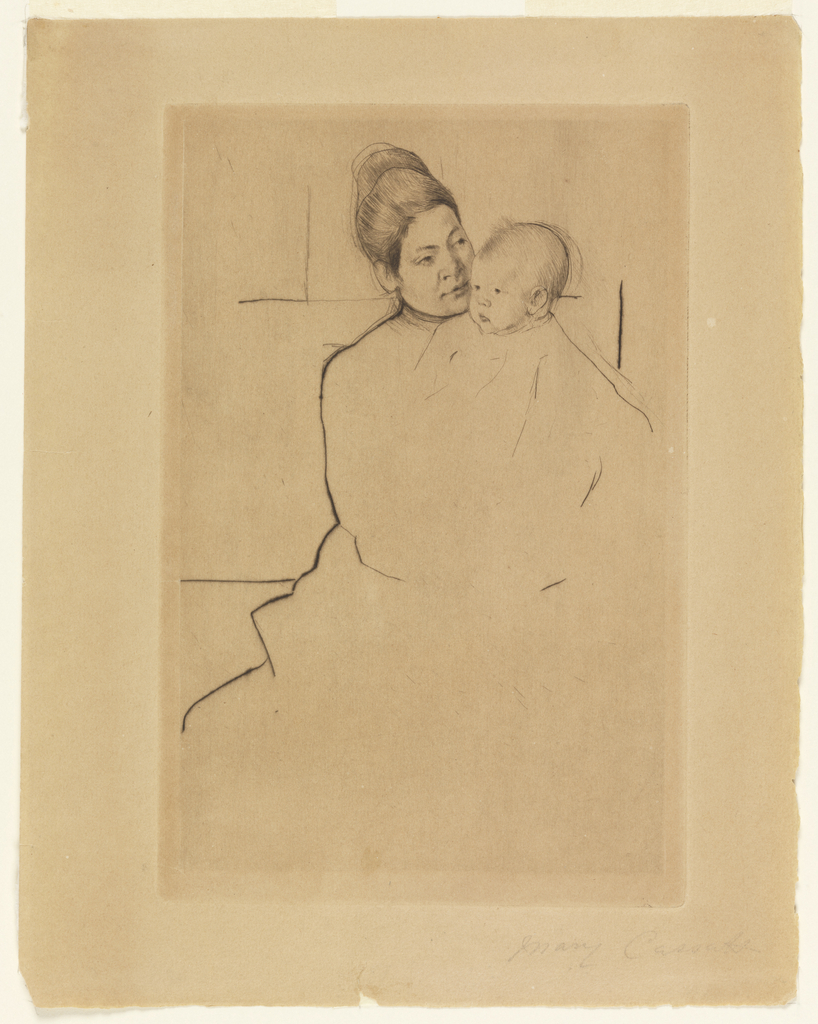
- Artist: Mary Cassatt
- Year: ca. 1889
- Catalogue: Br 113
- Type: Drypoint print, black ink on cream coloured paper
- Dimensions: 21.1 cm × 14.0 cm (8.3 in × 5.5 in)
- Location: Cooper–Hewitt, National Design Museum
- Website: Museum page

Gardner (Cassatt) Held by His Mother is a drypoint print dated circa 1889 by the American painter, printmaker, pastelist, and connoisseur Mary Cassatt. The example illustrated is in the collection of the Cooper-Hewitt Museum and is a gift of Samuel Putnam Avery.

== The print ==
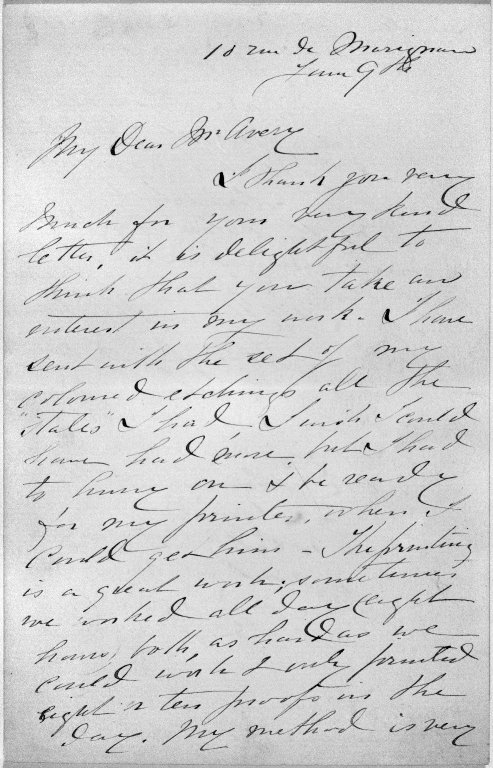
Letter to Samuel Putnam Avery from Mary Cassatt, Brooklyn Museum

The infant is Cassatt's nephew Joseph Gardner Cassatt III by her brother Gard and sister-in-law Eugenie Carter (Jennie). Cassatt's biographer Nancy M. Mathews dates the print as executed in 1888. (Note: Mathews and Shapiro (1998) note n.25 p. 54 that the print is inscribed "Jan/88") Cassatt painted several portraits of Jennie, but only one quick drypoint sketch of Gard exists, probably executed at the same time as this print of Jennie and the baby. There are at least two other portraits of the young Gardner, of which one is the pastel Gardner and Ellen Mary Cassatt in the collection of the Metropolitan Museum of Art.

Cassatt came into conflict with her sister-in-law over women's suffrage. Nancy Mathews estimates Cassatt as unquestionably feminist from an early age, but described her feminism as a private, nuanced position that would not allow her to organise exhibitions in pursuit of the feminist cause. Although she did not join any groups advocating women's suffrage she did nevertheless support it, and allowed her friend Louisine Havemeyer, a committed and active feminist, to organise a 1915 exhibition of hers and Edgar Degas's work, together with a selection of Old Masters, at an exhibition at the Knoedler Gallery, New York, in support of the cause. However Eugenie was anti-suffrage, a position that Cassatt could not understand, and Eugenie and family, along with Philadelphia society in general, boycotted the show. Cassatt responded by selling off her work that would otherwise have gone to her heirs. This example of the Gardner print was, however, already in the collection of Samuel Putnam Avery, the American connoisseur and art dealer, a personal friend of Cassatt's and one of her most active collectors who went on to donate his entire collection of 17,775 etchings and lithographs to the New York Public Library in 1900.

Cassatt considered herself a painter and not a draftsman, but she was an accomplished printmaker. The medium did not come naturally to her, but she was inevitably caught up in what came to be known as the Etching Revival championed by her Impressionist friends. Her mentor Edgar Degas, whose pastels so inspired her, was working with artists such as Henri Guérard (husband of Eva Gonzalès, another woman painter in the Impressionist circle) to develop more "painterly" effects in printmaking. During the fall and winter of 1879–80 Cassatt worked by day at Degas' studio, which was equipped with a small etching press, acquiring her technique, while her evenings were spent on drawings to be transferred to the etching plate next day. These drawing were of domestic scenes as well as of the theatre scenes associated with her.

By 1885 Cassatt had begun to work exclusively in drypoint, a spare and restrained technique worked directly on the plate with the aid of a specially hardened drypoint needle, concentrating on line rather than the "brush" technique she had formerly sought. Later still, inspired by Japanese prints that had been exhibited in Paris, she turned her attention back to the aquatint process, a print process that emulates the watercolorist's wash, exhibiting in 1891 a series of ten highly original colored drypoint and aquatint prints, including Woman Bathing and In the Omnibus. Adelyn D. Breeskin, Cassatt's most noted historian and the author of two catalogue raisonnés of her work, notes that these colored prints, "now stand as her most original contribution... adding a new chapter to the history of graphic arts...technically, as color prints, they have never been surpassed". In all Cassatt executed just 22 color prints. An example of Woman Bathing fetched $218,500 at a Christie's sale in October 2010.

The 1888 Gardner print is generally regarded as the earliest dated example of the mother and child images that grew into Cassatt's greatest body of work, approaching a third of her entire opus. There had been earlier examples of the theme, notably Mother About To Wash Her Sleepy Child (probably the very earliest example) that she showed at the Fifth Impressionist Exhibition of 1880, but it was this print that ushered in what was to become her signature theme.

== Gallery ==
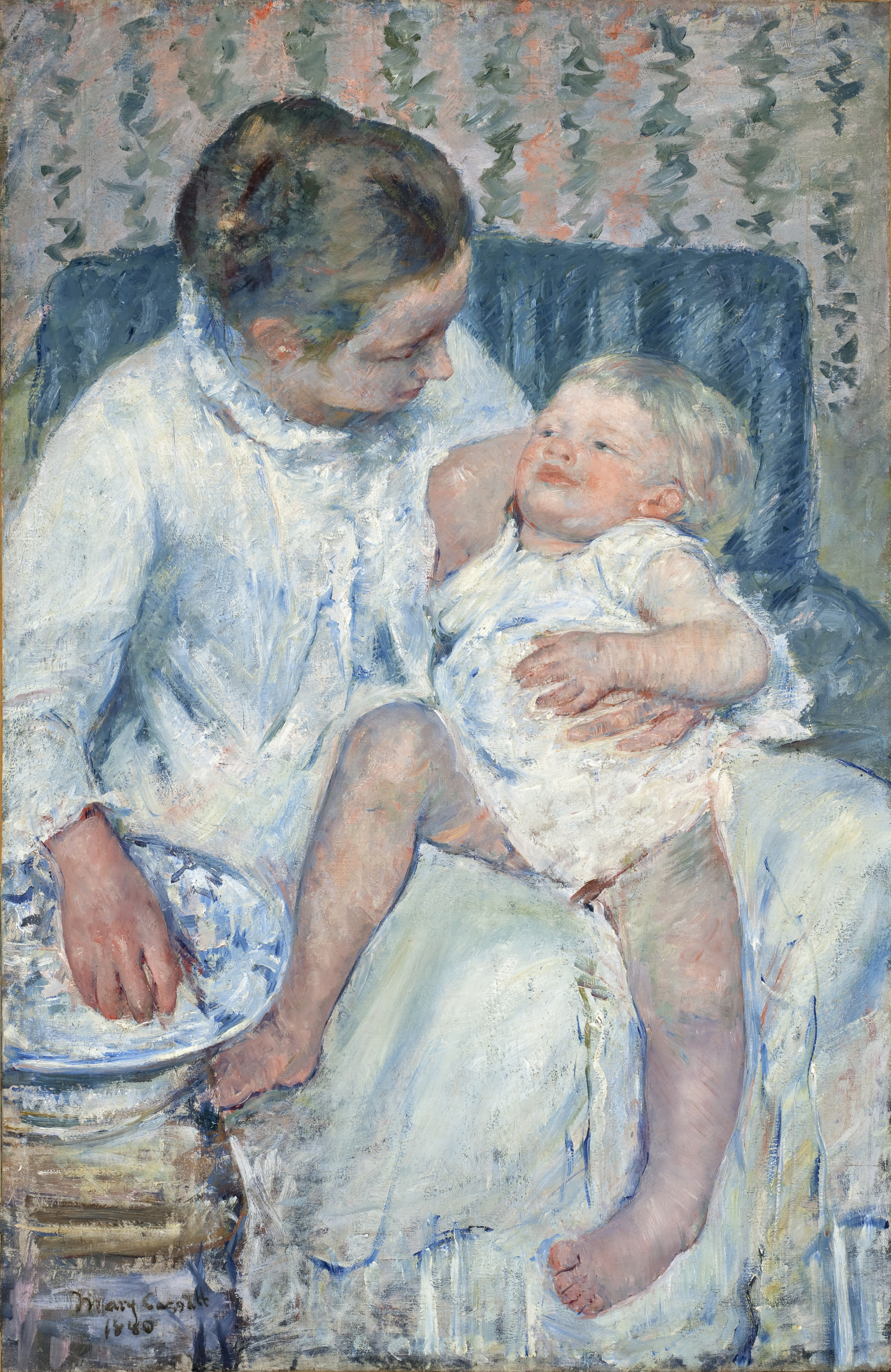
Mother About to Wash Her Sleepy Child, (oil on canvas, 1880), Los Angeles County Museum of Art.

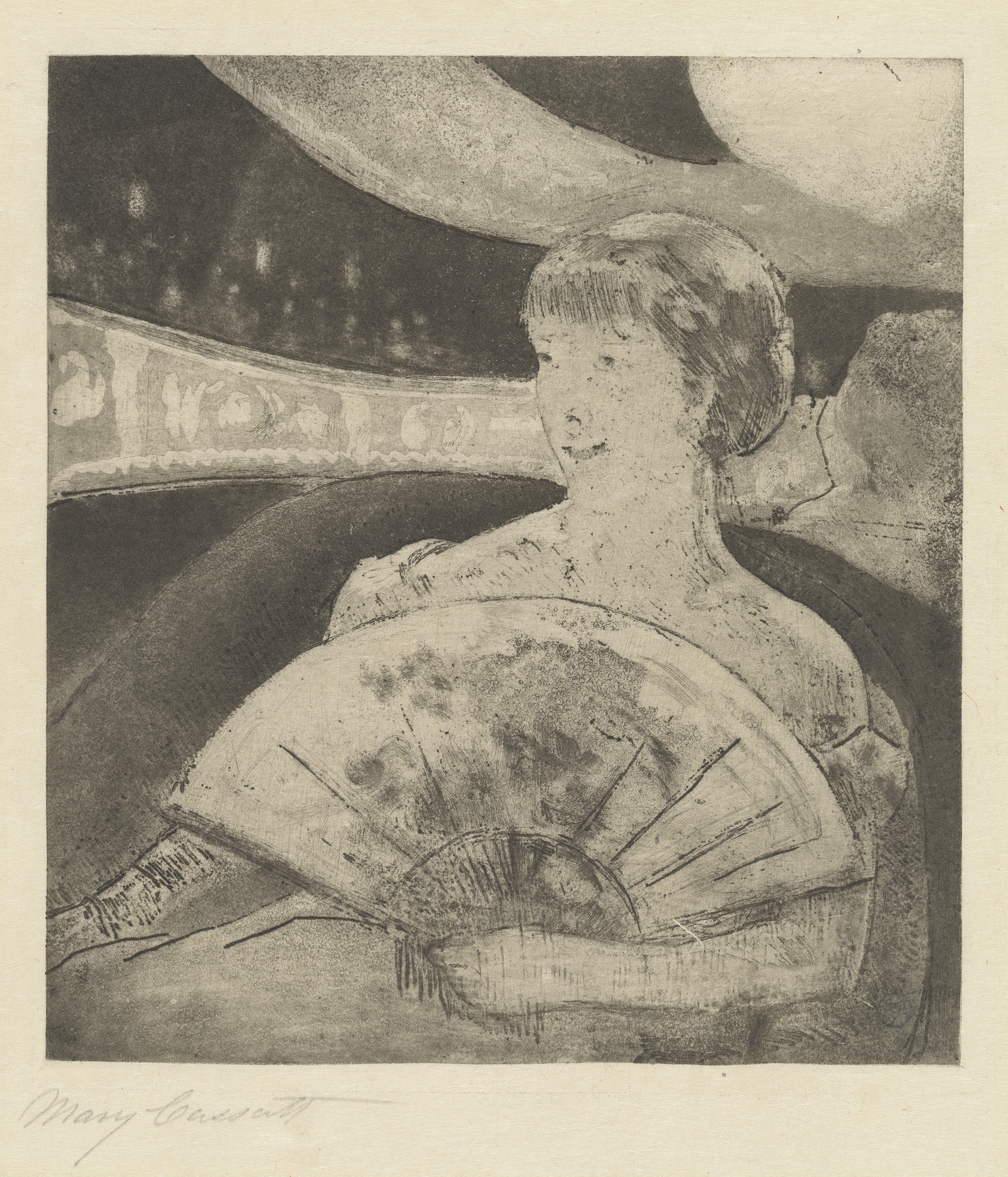
In the Opera Box (No. 3) (softground and aquatint, c. 1880), National Gallery of Art, Washington

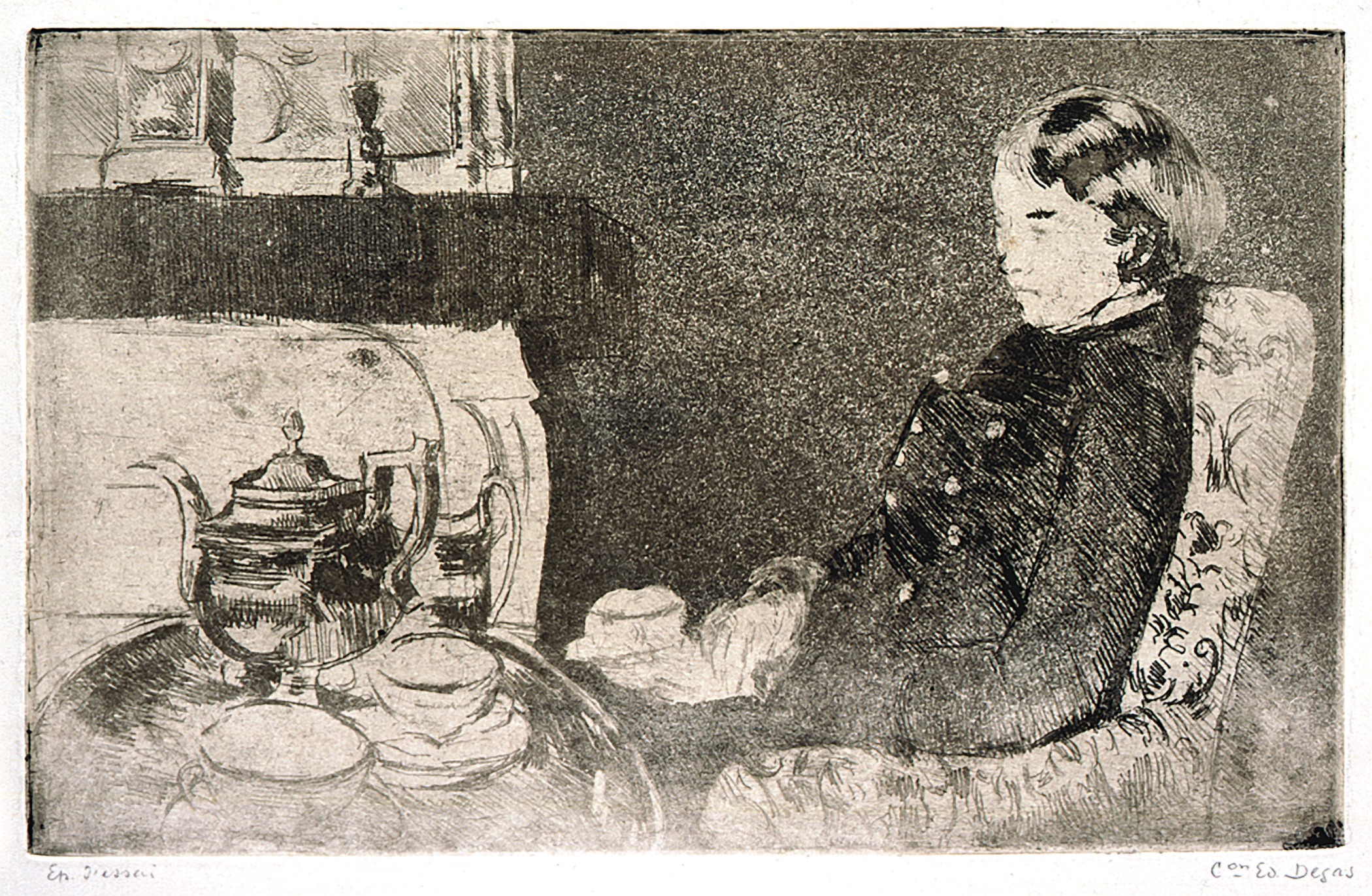
Lydia at Afternoon Tea (softground and aquatint, c. 1883), Los Angeles County Museum of Art.

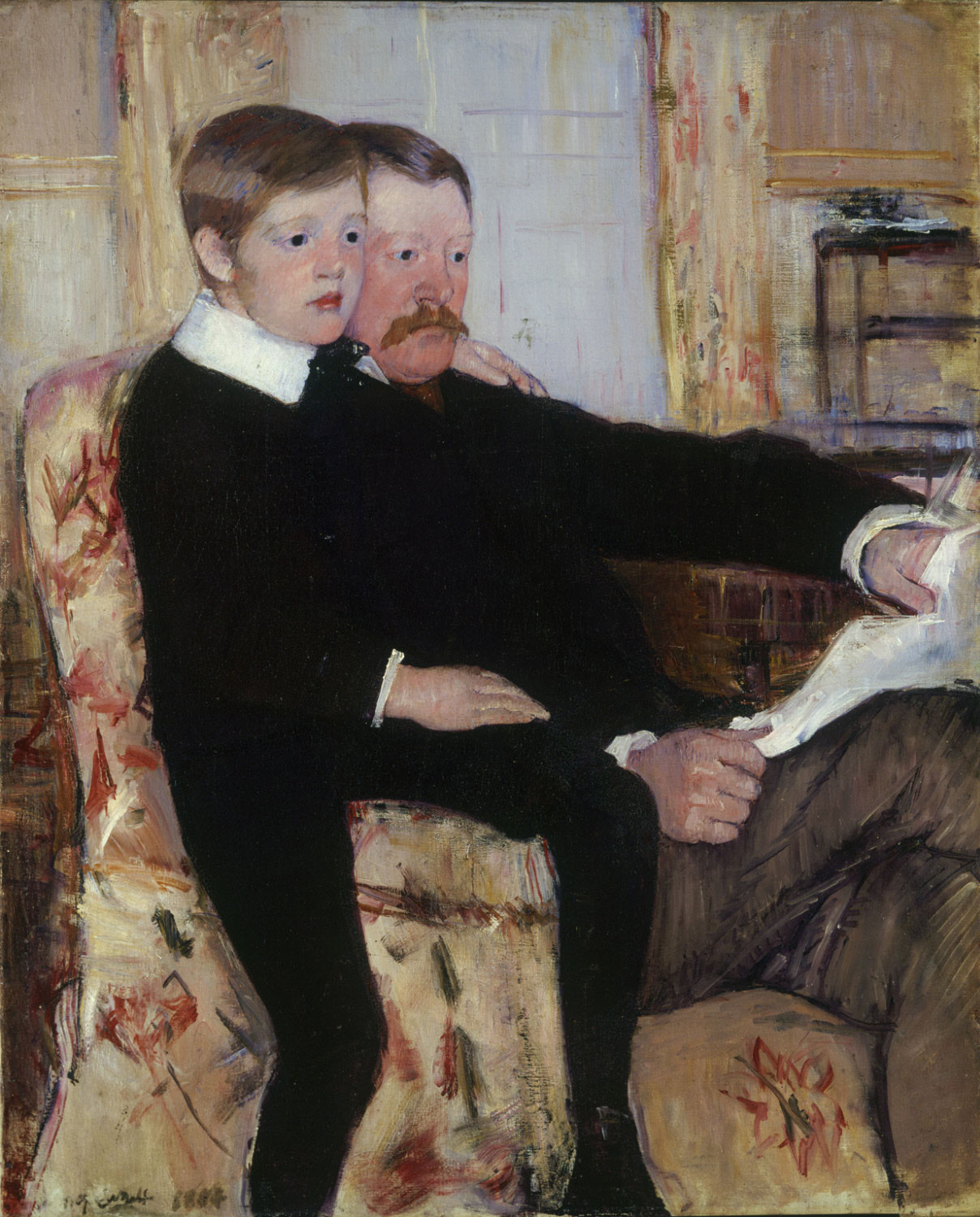
Portrait of Alexander J. Cassatt and His Son, Robert Kelso Cassatt (oil on canvas, 1884), Philadelphia Museum of Art.

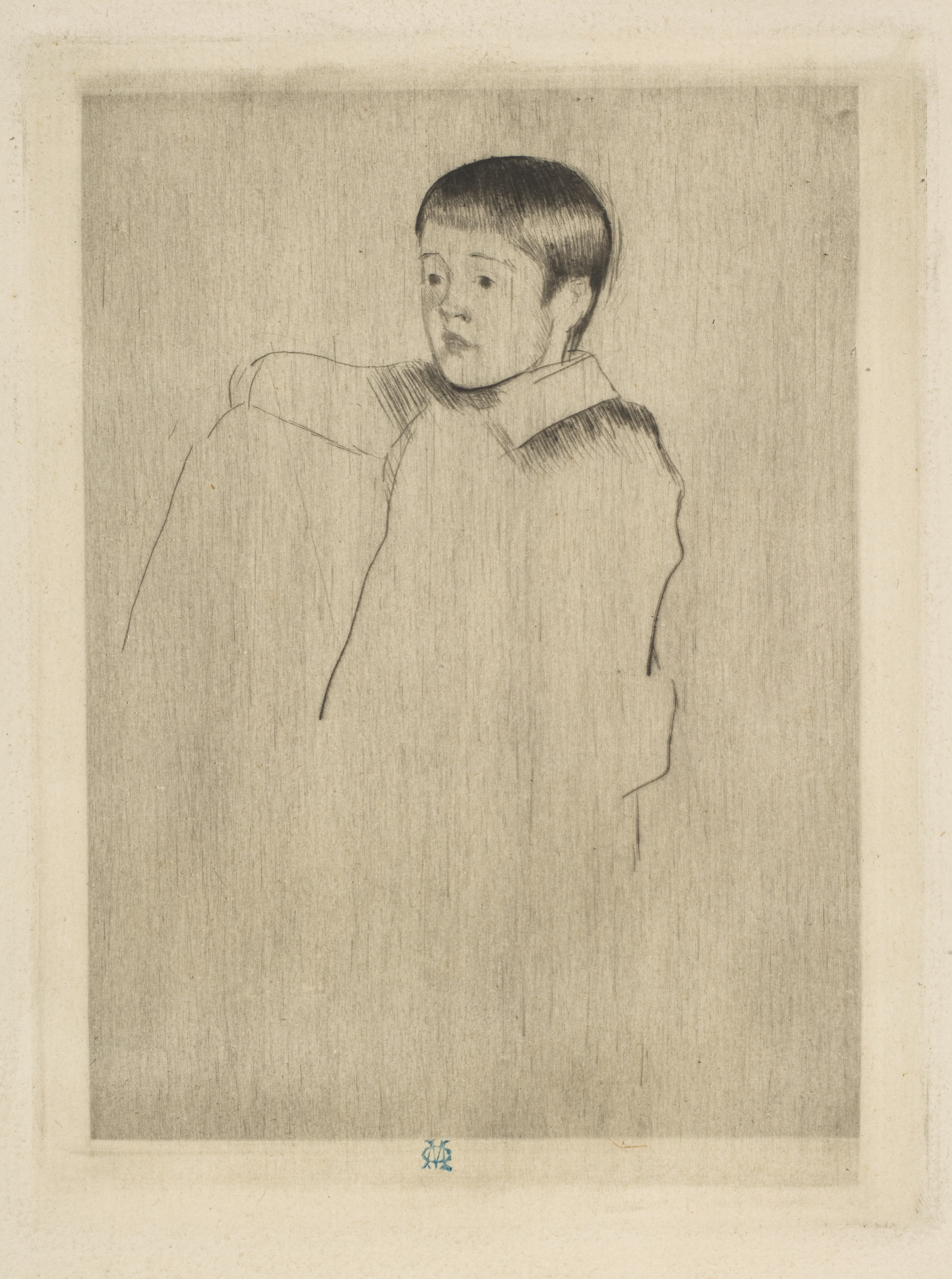
Robert Seated, Facing Left (drypoint, 1885), Metropolitan Museum of Art.

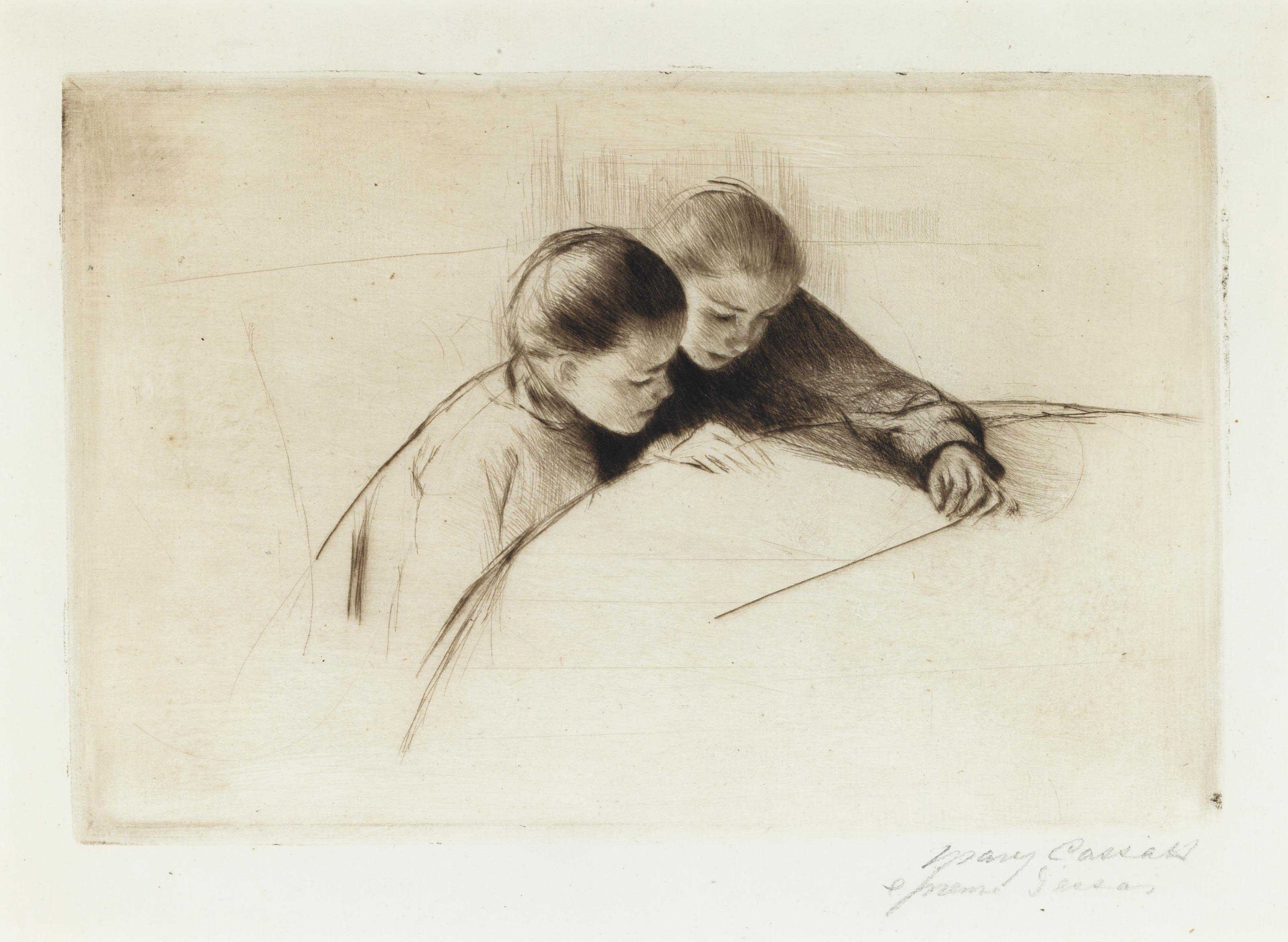
The Map (drypoint, 1890), private collection.

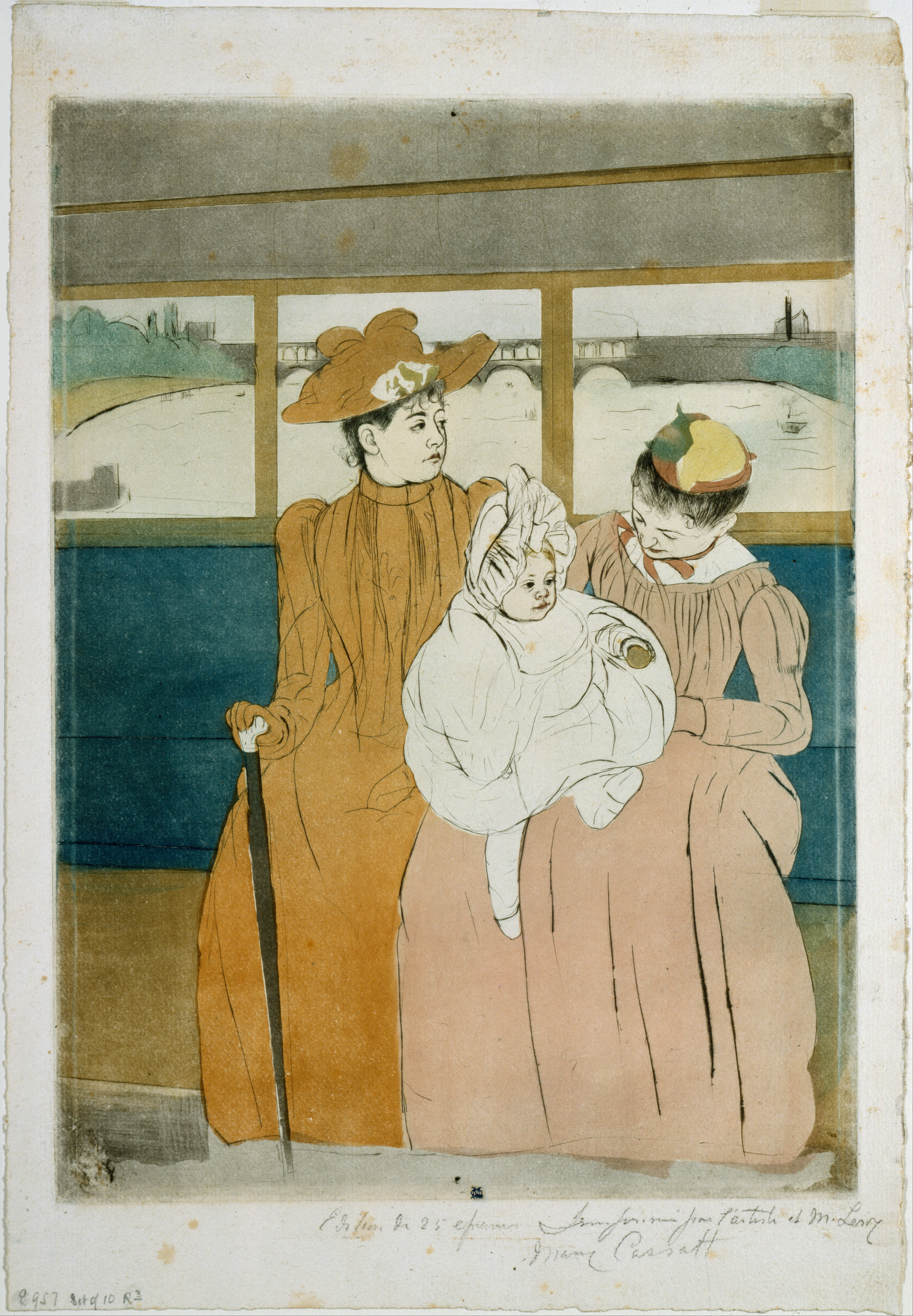
In the Omnibus, (drypoint and aquatint, 1890-91), National Gallery of Art, Washington.

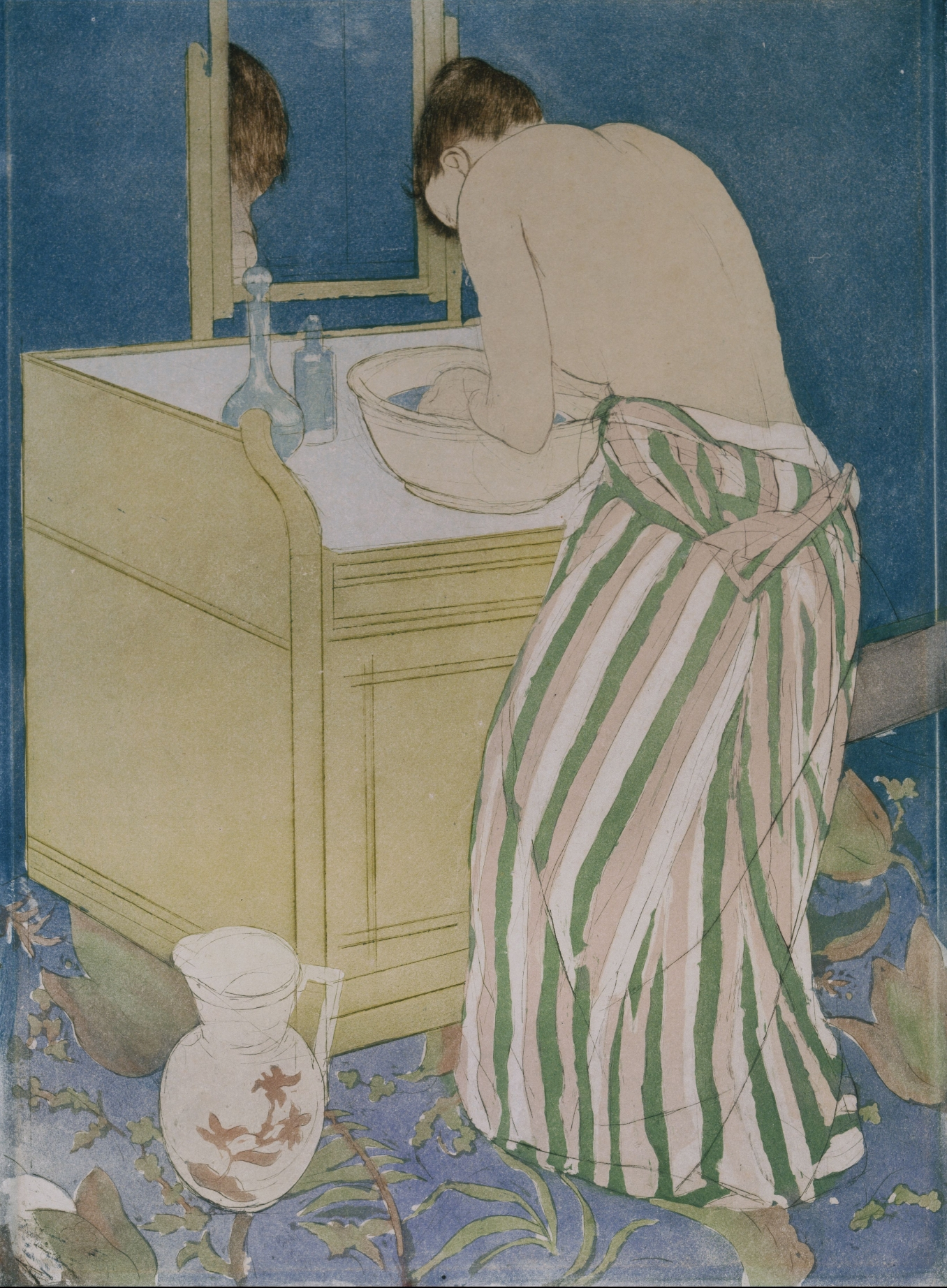
Woman Bathing, (drypoint and aquatint, 1890-91), Terra Foundation for American Art.

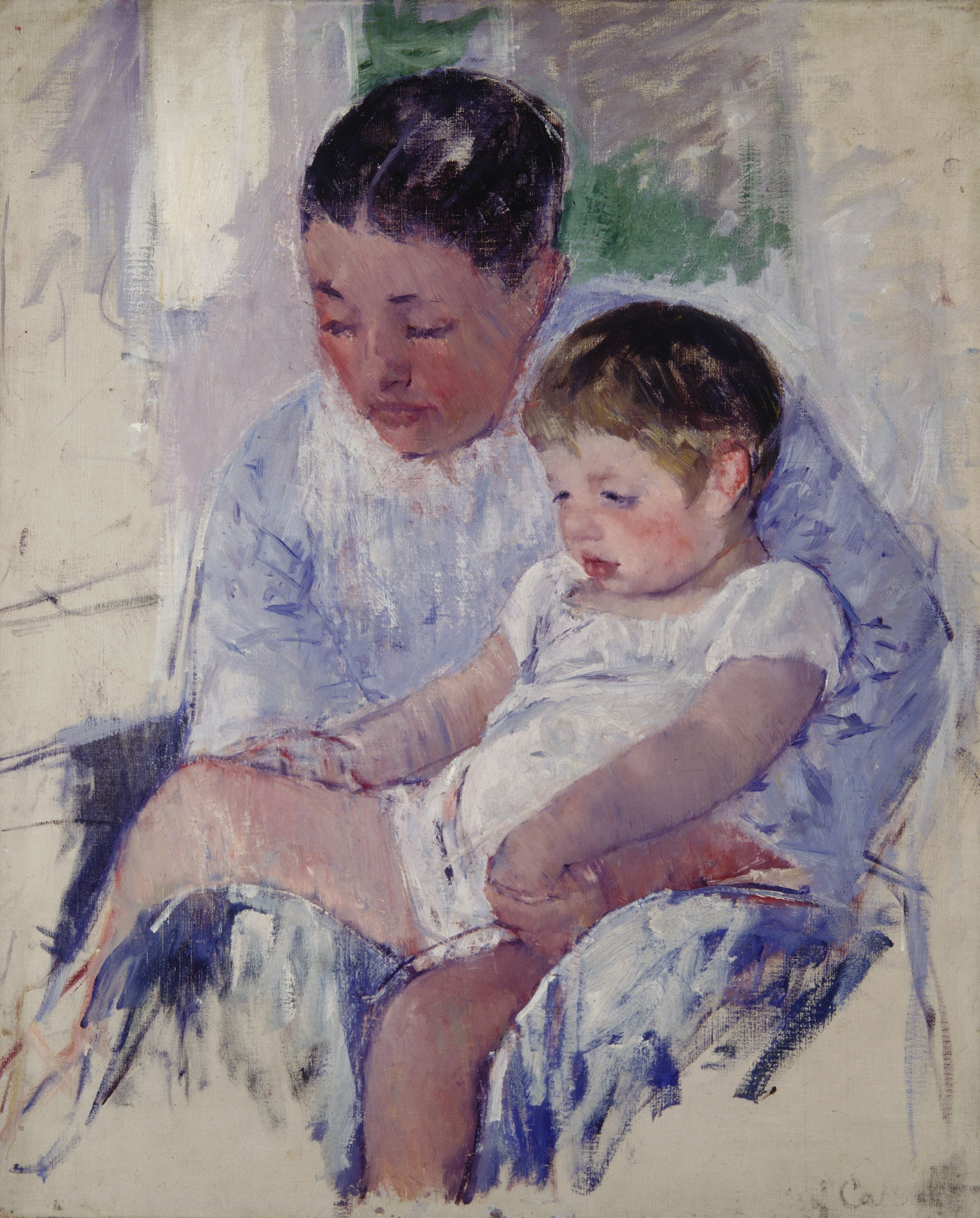
Jenny and Her Sleepy Child (oil on canvas, between 1891 and 1892), Terra Foundation for American Art. (Note: Jenny and her Sleepy Child, in the collection of the Terra Foundation for American Art, is known not be the same pair in Gardner (Cassatt) Held by His Mother, as Cassatt did not revisit her sister-in-law until 1891, by which time young Gardner was already five years old and too old to be the toddler portrayed here.)

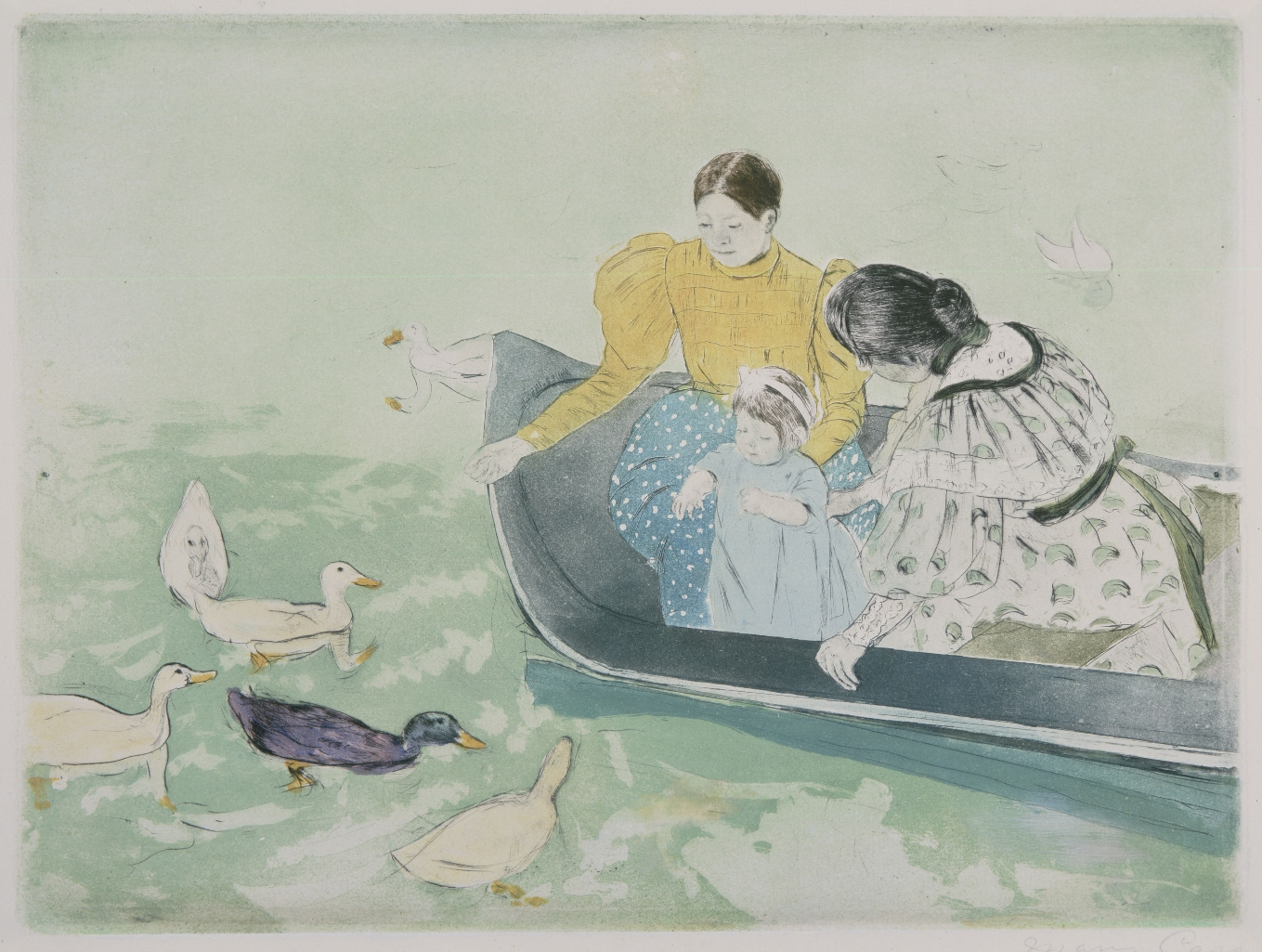
Feeding the Ducks, (drypoint, softgound and aquatint, 1895), Terra Foundation for American Art.

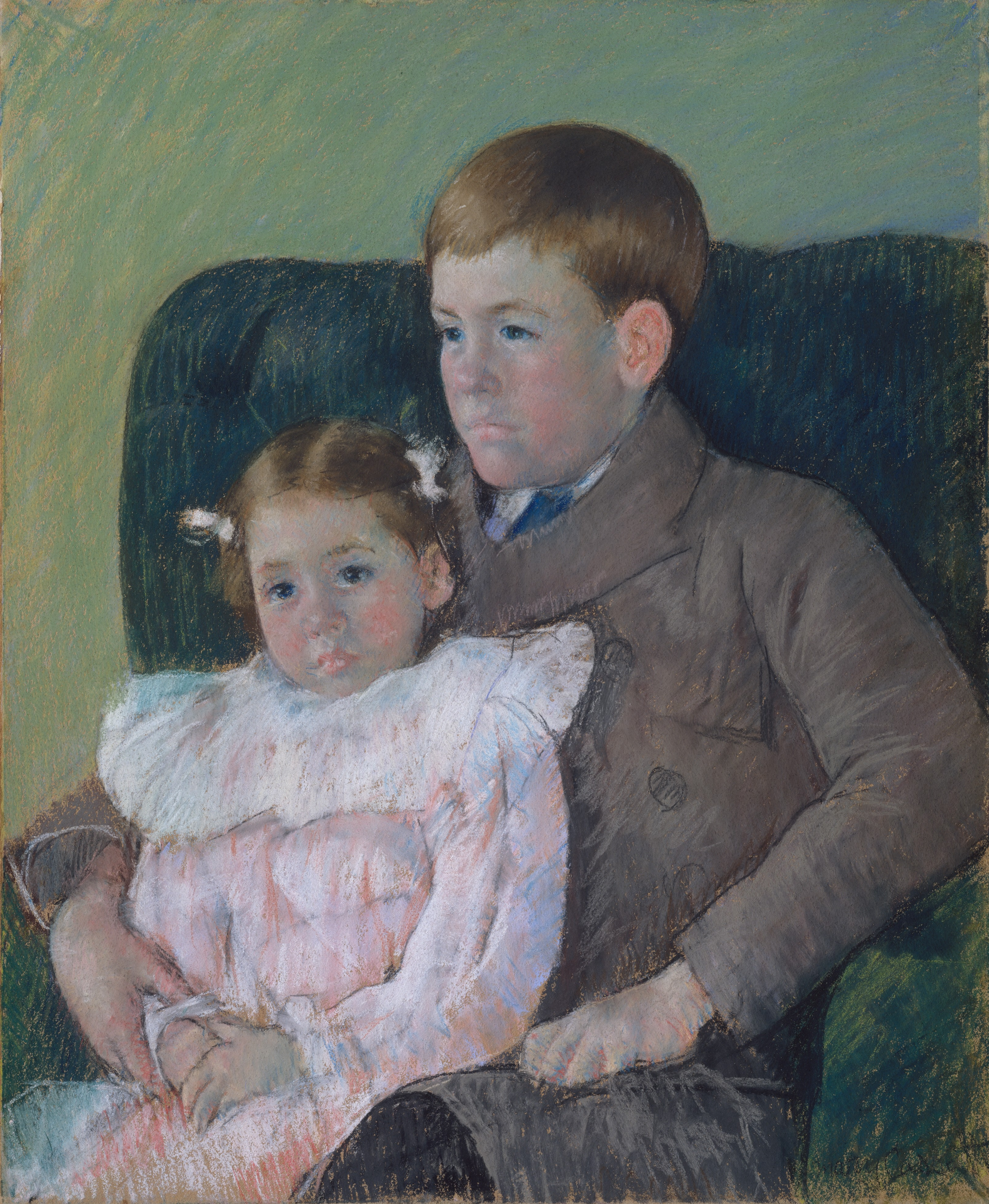
Gardner and Ellen Mary Cassatt (pastel, 1899), Metropolitan Museum of Art.

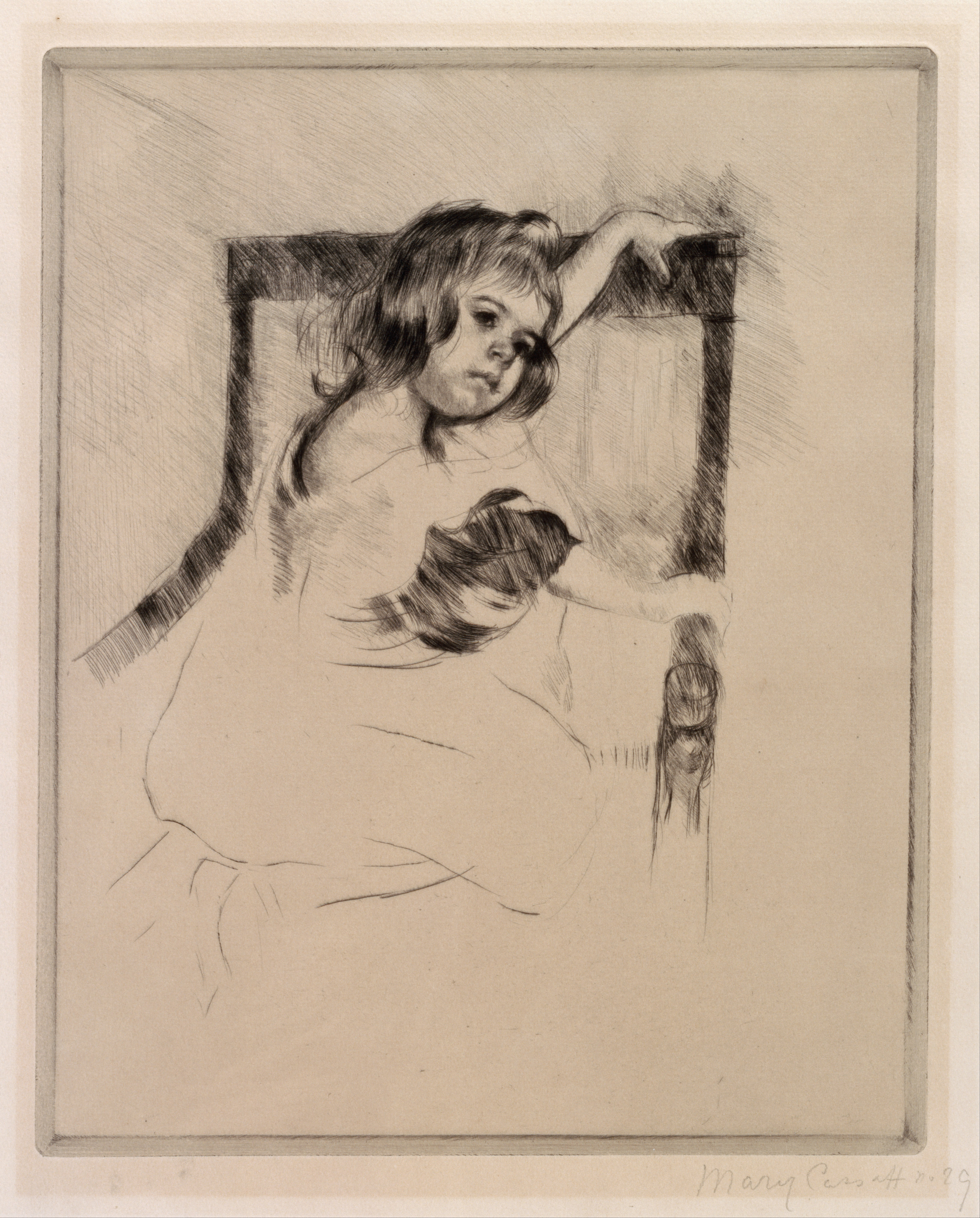
Kneeling in an Armchair (drypoint, 1903), Nelson-Atkins Museum of Art.

== See also ==
- List of works by Mary Cassatt

== Bibliography ==
- Barter, Judith A.., ed. (1998). Mary Cassatt, modern woman / organized by Judith A. Barter; with contributions by Erica E. Hirshler ... [et al.]. New York: Harry N. Abrams, Inc. ISBN 0810940892. LCCN 98007306.
- Mathews, Nancy Mowll (1994). Mary Cassatt: A Life. New York: Villard Books. ISBN 978-0-394-58497-3. LCCN 98-8028.
- Mathews, Nancy Mowll; Shapiro, Barbara (1998). Mary Cassatt: The Color Prints. New York: Harry N. Abrams. ISBN 0-8109-1049-7. LCCN 88-8107.
- McKown, Robin (1972). The World of Mary Cassatt. New York: Thomas Y. Crowell Co. ISBN 978-0-690-90274-7. LCCN 77139106.
