= Norbert Goeneutte =

French painter

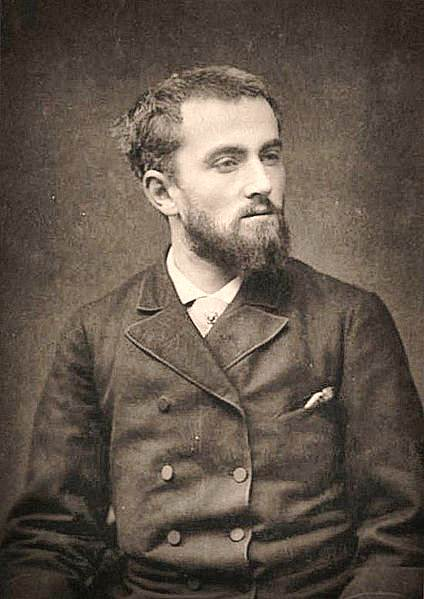
Norbert Goeneutte (1881); from L’Album Artistique et Biographique du Salon

Norbert Goeneutte (23 July 1854 – 9 October 1894) was a French painter, etcher and illustrator; notably for the novel La Terre by Émile Zola.

== Biography ==
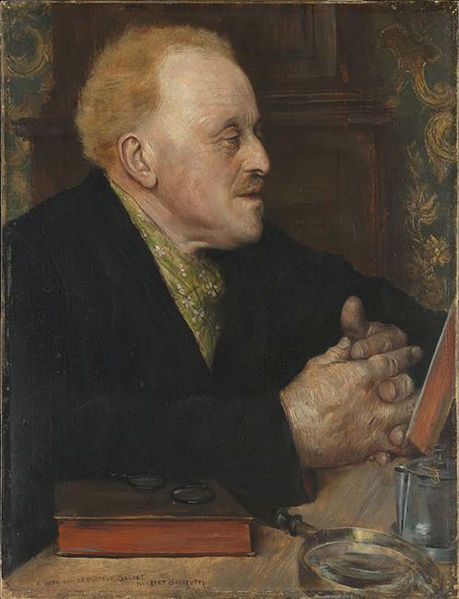
Portrait of Paul Gachet (1891)

He was born in Paris into a family that had moved there from Saint-Omer 1850. He attended classes at the Lycée Condorcet. Following a long interruption by the Franco-Prussian War and the Commune, when he lived away from Paris, he graduated in 1871 and his father found him a place in an attorney's office.

His father died shortly thereafter and Norbert persuaded his mother that he was not suited for that sort of work. She agreed, so he entered the École des Beaux-arts and began studies with Isidore Pils. When Pils died in 1875, he was replaced by Henri Lehmann, who was not liked by his students. They wrote to Édouard Manet, asking him to take Lehmann's place, but he declined. Some students remained, but Goeneutte left to set up his own studio.

He frequented the Père Lathuille, a famous cabaret, where he met Manet and was introduced to the artistic circle at the Café de la Nouvelle Athènes. He soon began exhibiting at the Salon but, despite his friendship with many notable Impressionists, never participated in one of their group exhibitions.

With the financial support of his brother, he frequently travelled abroad, including trips to London (1880) and Venice (1890). He also travelled extensively in France. These visits produced a multitude of landscapes and cityscapes. In 1889, he became one of the founders of the " Société des peintres-graveurs français", together with his friends Henri Guérard and Félix Bracquemond. That same year, he exhibited at the Exposition Universelle. Two years later, he found himself at odds with the Société when it refused admission to Camille Pissarro, who was not born in France.

In 1891, doctor Paul Gachet, an avid supporter of the arts and an amateur artist, diagnosed Goeneutte as having a weak heart and recommended that he settle in a rural area for his health. Gachet was able to find him a house near his own in Auvers-sur-Oise, called the "Villa Musette", where Goeneutte settled with his mother, his sister Reine and his brother Charles. Once there, he became involved with a group of artists associated with Charles-François Daubigny and did engraved illustrations together with Gachet. Three years later, he died of complications from what had turned out to be a lung disease (possibly tuberculosis). He is buried there, near the grave of Vincent van Gogh, who had also been treated by Gachet during his final illness.

== Selected paintings ==
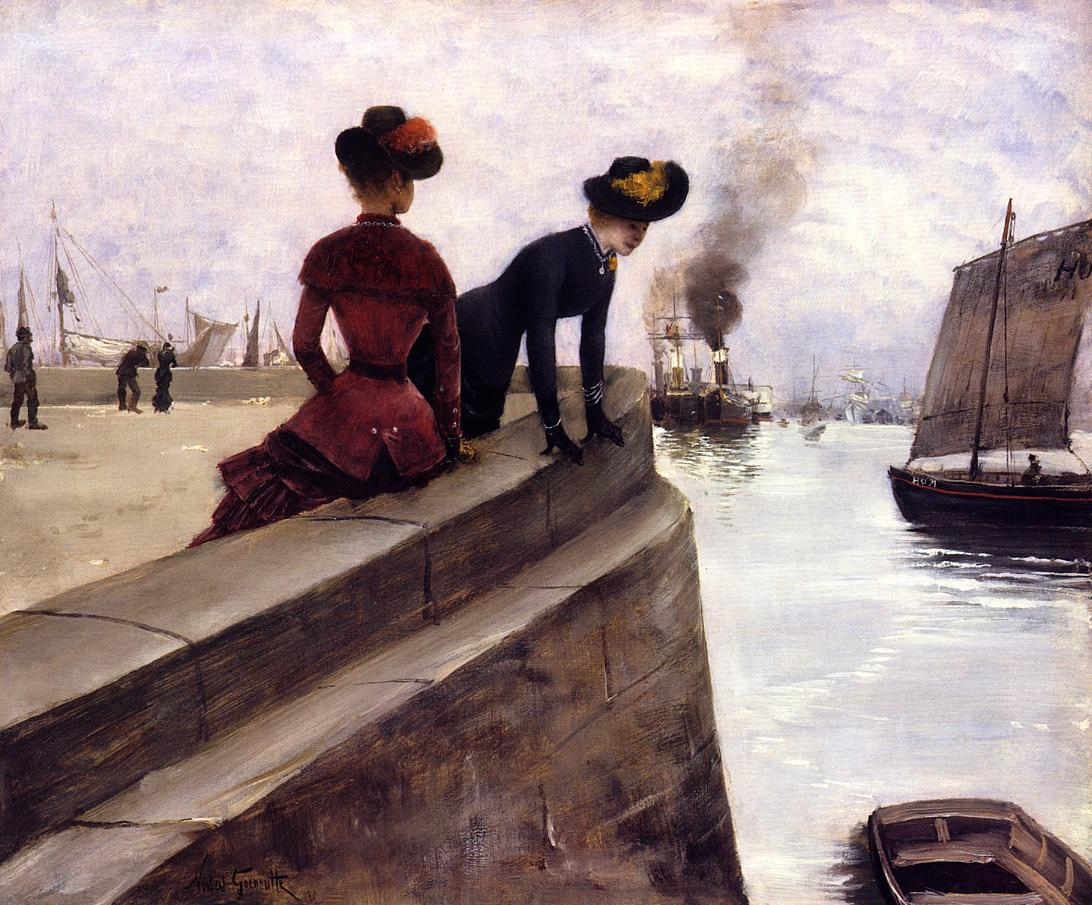
On the Jetty at Le Havre (1887)

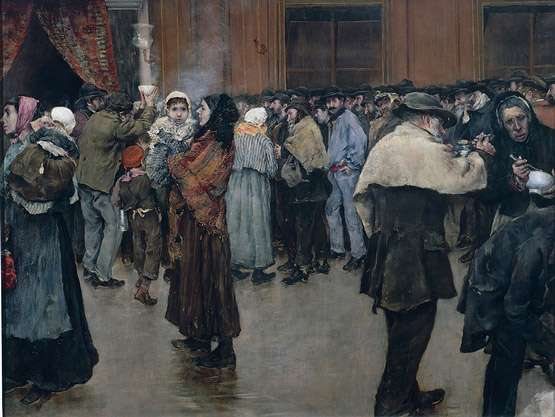
Morning Soup
(date unknown)

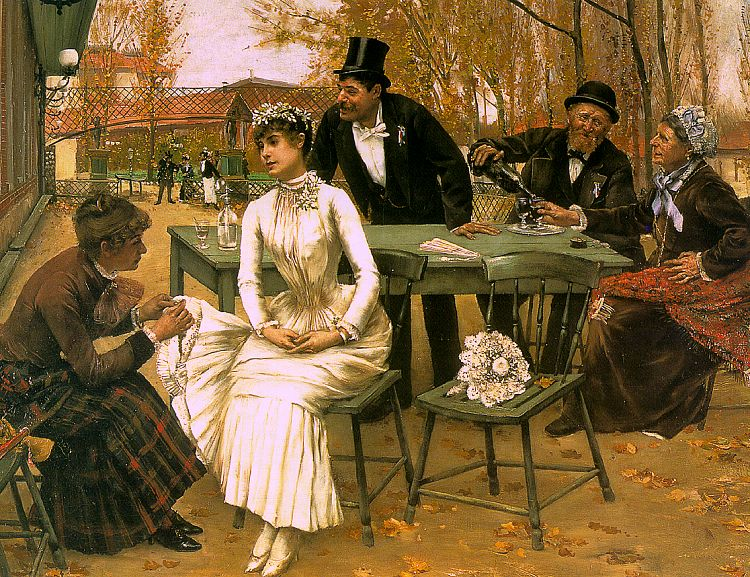
The First Tear (1884)

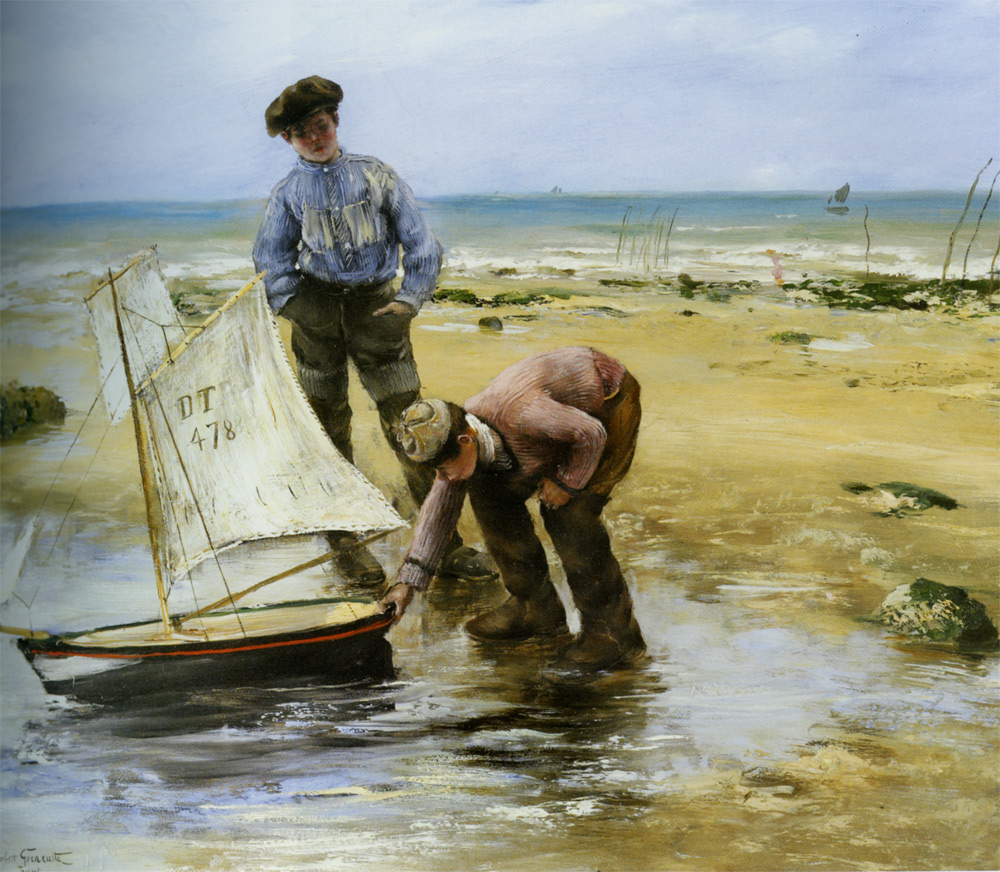
Boys Playing on the Beach (1881)
