= Henri Guérard =

French painter and engraver

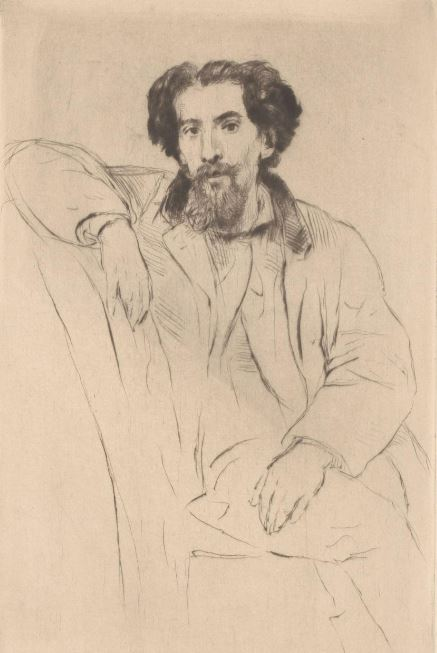
Henri Guérard; portrait by Marcellin Desboutin (1876)

Henri Charles Guérard (26 April 1846, Paris - 24 March 1897, Paris) was a French painter and printmaker, particularly in etching and lithography.

== Biography ==
He began his studies at the École Nationale Supérieure des Beaux-Arts, majoring in architecture, but gradually turned his attention to painting and engraving. In 1870, he became a student of Nicolas Berthon.

The year 1873 saw the first issue of Paris à l'eau-forte, a weekly magazine of current affairs and amusements, founded by the writer Richard Lesclide. Guérard and Paul Gachet were in charge of the illustrations. During this time, he frequented the salon of Nina de Callias and became a friend of Édouard Manet. Later, together with the actress, Ellen Andrée, he posed for one of Manet's paintings; "At the Café".

In 1879, he married Eva Gonzalès, one of Manet's students and models. They moved to a farm near Honfleur, where they hosted several well known painters, including Paul Cézanne and Norbert Goeneutte, who became a close friend. Two years later, he illustrated Les Caravanes de Scaramouche, by his father-in-law, Emmanuel Gonzalès.

Eva died in 1883, while giving birth to their son, Jean Raimond, who would become a theatrical painter. His friend, Manet, had also died five days earlier, leaving him too depressed to work for a long period. He remarried in 1888, to his sister-in-law, Jeanne Gonzalès, who was also a painter.

During this period, he provided illustrations for L'Art Japonais of Louis Gonse, published by Albert Quantin. Shortly after, he created his own Japonisme, an album of ten etchings, published by Edmond Sagot. In 1889, together with Félix Bracquemond, he created the Société des peintres-graveurs français, which held exhibits at the Durand-Ruel Gallery. He was named a Knight in the Legion of Honor in 1893.

He was an avid collector (what might now be called a "hoarder") of everything from old shoes to lanterns. Many of his etchings are of odd objects and earned him a title: "The Engraver of Curiosities".

== Selected works ==
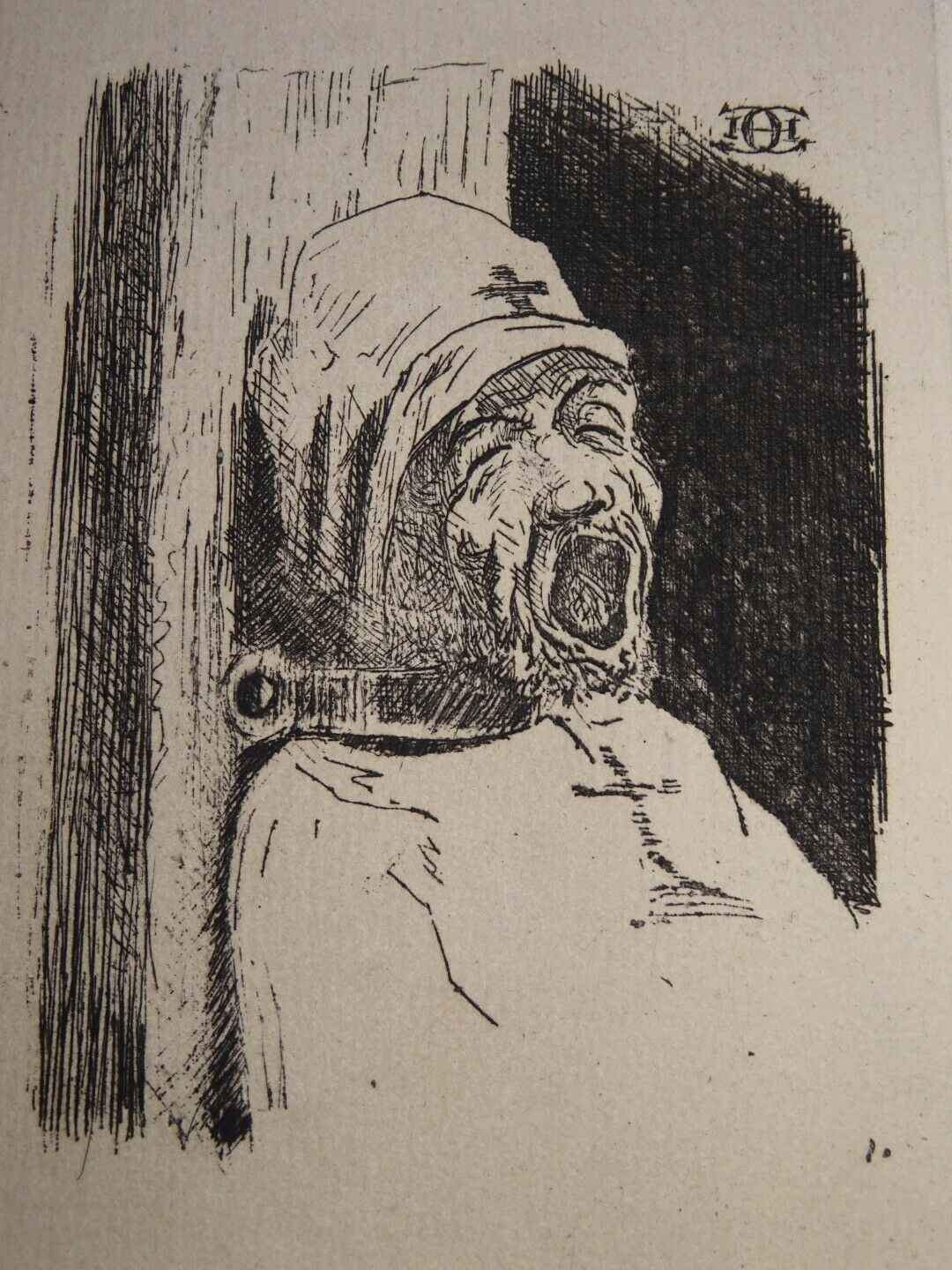
The Garotte

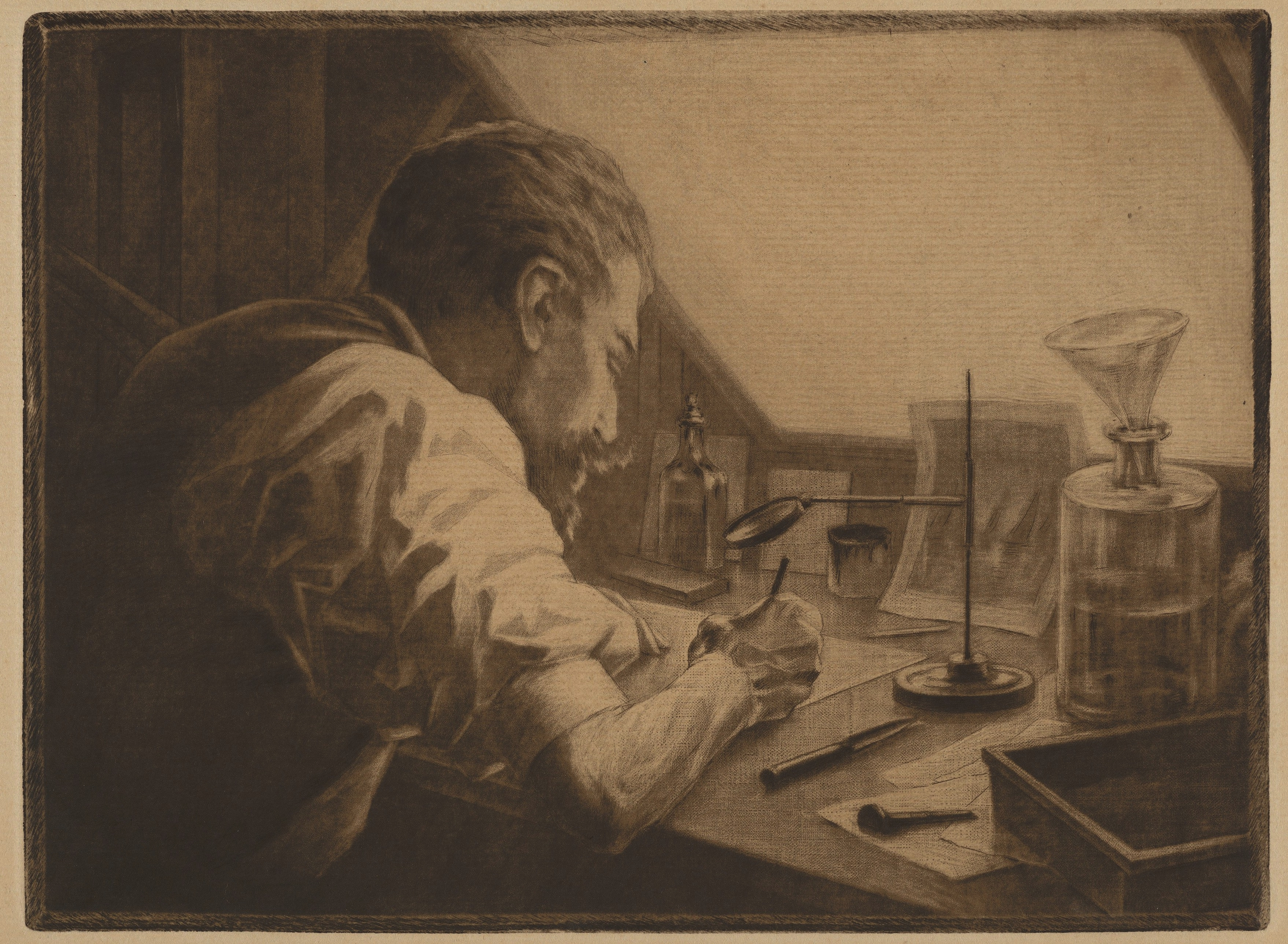
Self-portrait at Work

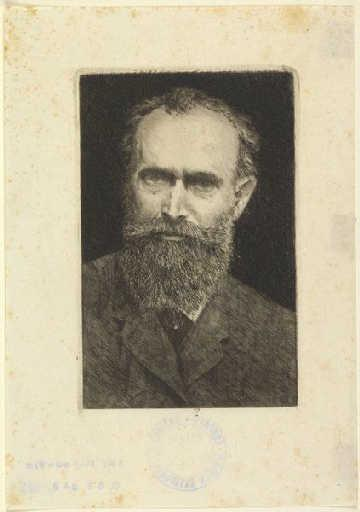
Portrait of
Édouard Manet

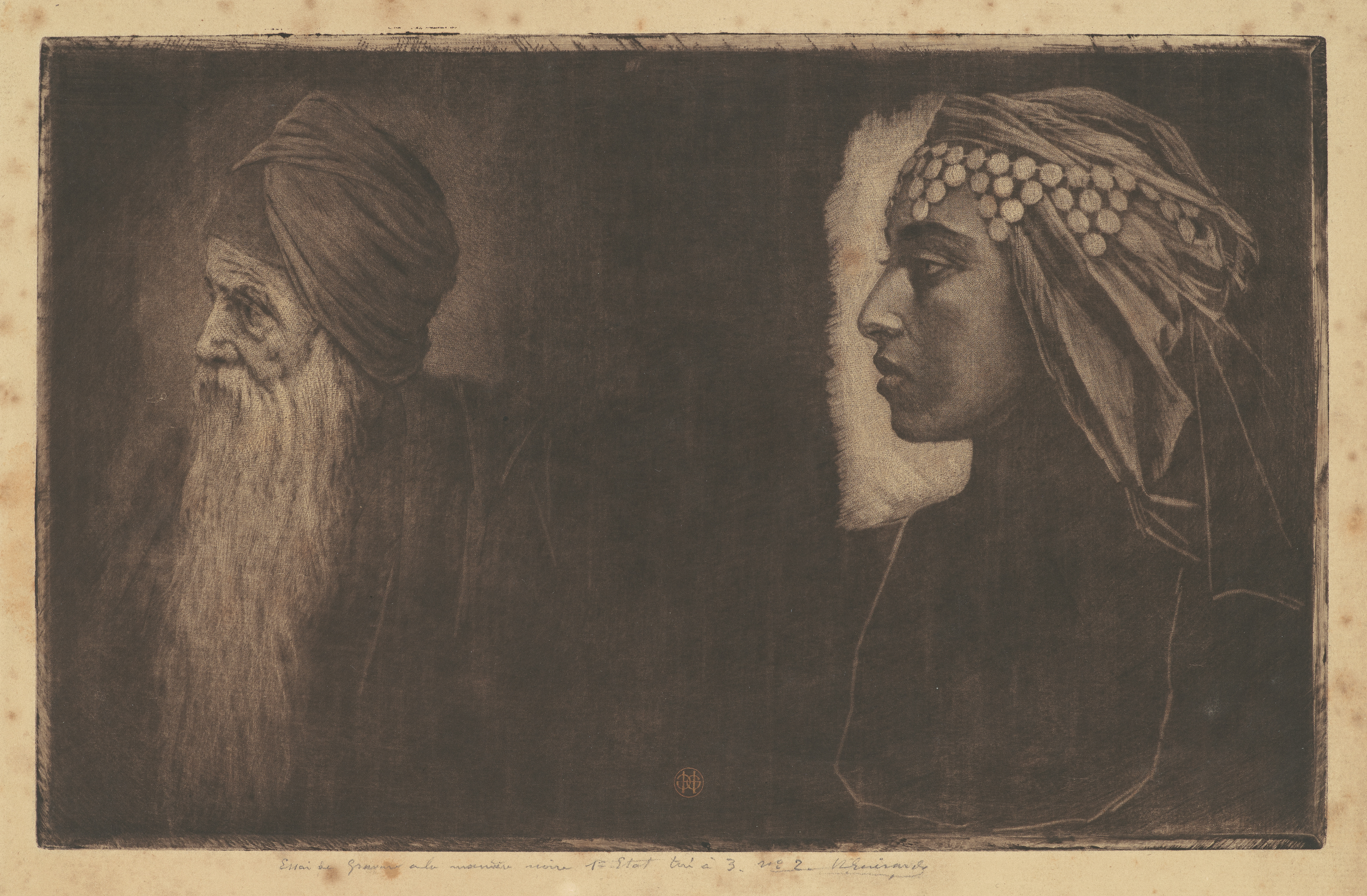
Solomon and Cleopatra

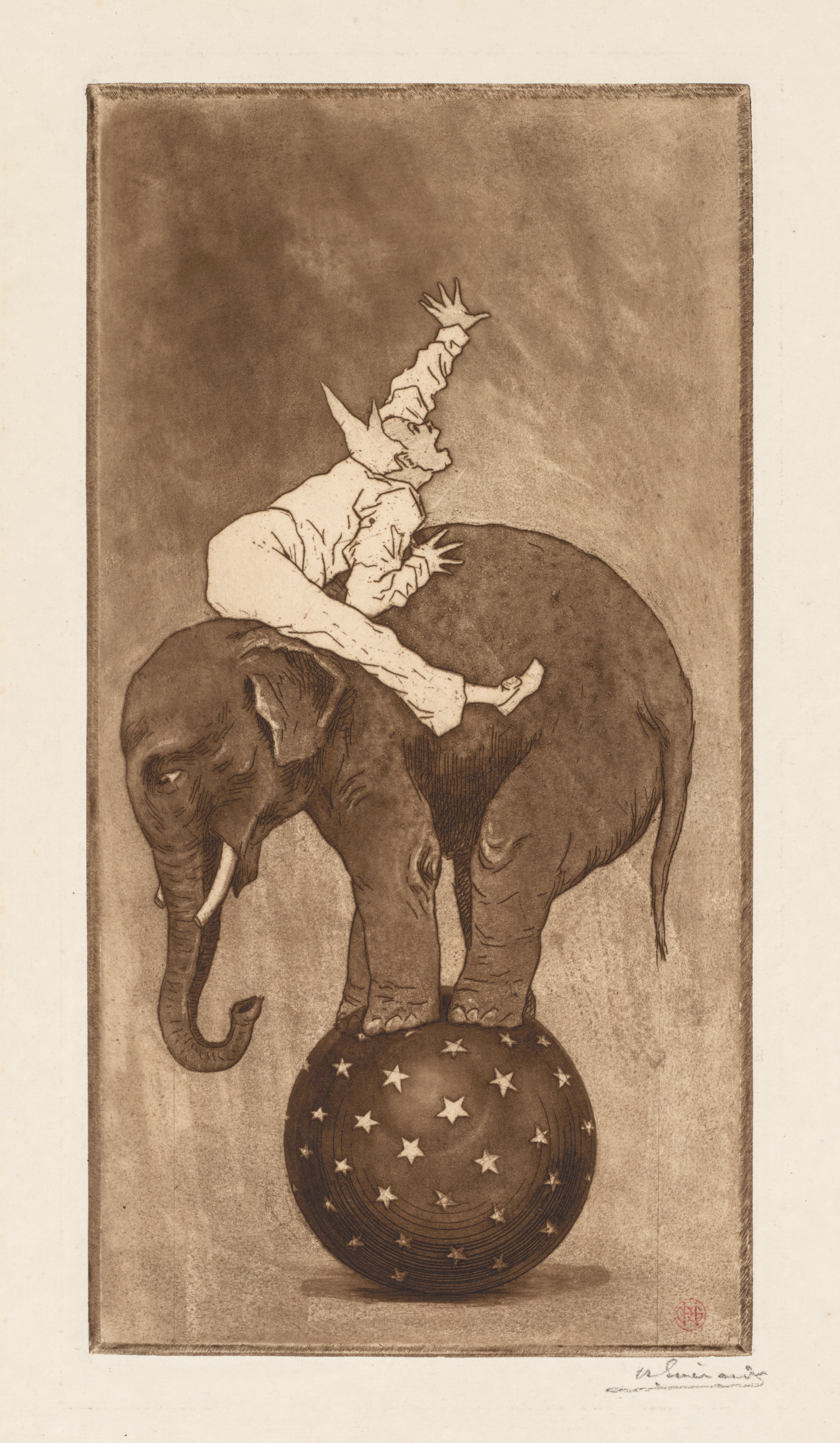
Elephant and Clown
