= Emmanuel Gonzalès =

French novelist (1815–1887)

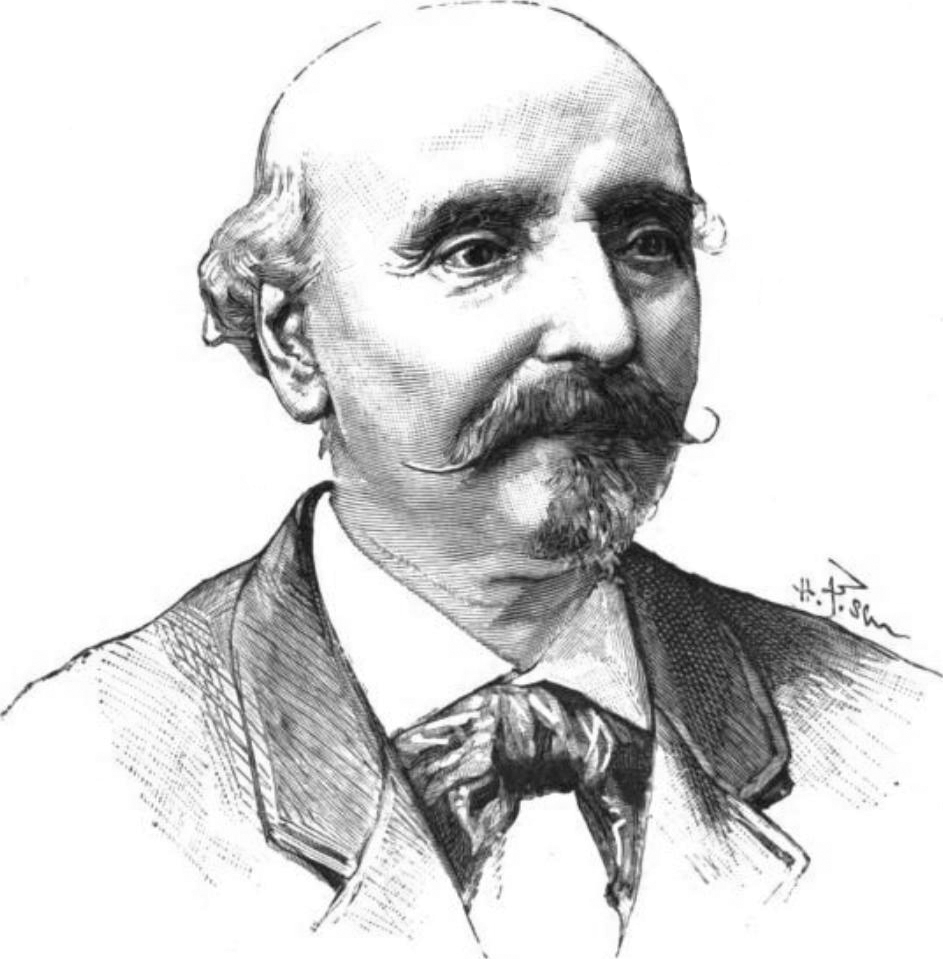
- Born: 25 October 1815; Saintes, Charente-Maritime
- Died: 17 October 1887 (aged 71); Paris
- Occupations: Novelist, playwright

Emmanuel Gonzalès (25 October 1815 – 17 October 1887) was a 19th-century French novelist, feuilletonist and playwright.

Gonzalès wrote the novel Frères de la côte, which impressed Émile Zola in his childhood, following the praise he made of its author on the occasion of the inauguration of a bust in his memory 25 October 1891. The ceremony was organized by the Société des gens de lettres, of which Gonzalès had been president from 1863. Zola knew him personally through Édouard Manet. Emmanuel Gonzales's daughter, Eva Gonzalès, entered Manet’s studio and became his only student, also serving as a model for his famous painting: Eva Gonzalès peignant dans l'atelier de Manet (1870).

== Main works ==
- 1838: Les Mémoires d'un ange
- 1841: Le Livre d'amour
- 1844: Les Frères de la côte
- 1849: Le Pêcheur de perles
- 1851: Le Vengeur du mari
- 1853: Le Chasseur d'hommes
- 1854: La Fille de l'aveugle
- 1856: Esau le lèpreux (Chroniques du temps de Duguesclin)
- 1857: Les Chercheurs d'or
- 1857: La Princesse russe
- 1860: Mes jardins de Monaco
- 1862: La Maîtresse du proscrit
- 1863: L'hôtesse du Connétable
- 1865: Les Proscrits de Sicile
- 1876: Les Danseuses du Caucase.
- 1877:La Servante du diable
- 1866: Les Sabotiers de la Forêt Noire
- 1880: L'Épée de Suzanne
- 1887: Rosario, (Short story in the collectif DENTU Pique-Nique)
