= Eva Gonzalès =

French painter (1849–1883)

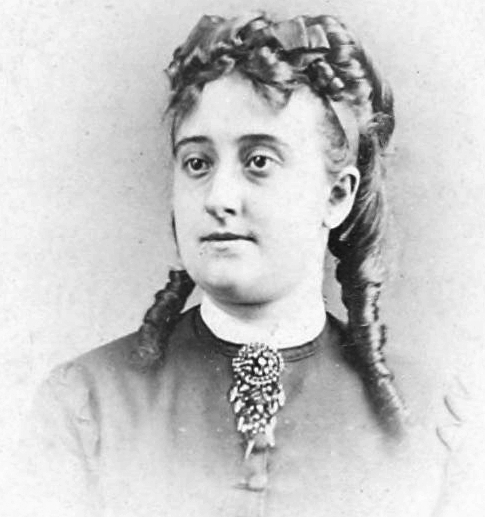
- Eva Gonzalès (1847–1883)
- Born: Eva Carola Jeanne Emmanuela Antoinette Gonzalès; 19 April 1847; Paris, France
- Died: 6 May 1883 (aged 36); Paris, France
- Education: Chaplin; Manet
- Known for: Painting
- Notable work: Une loge aux Théâtre des Italiens (1874)
- Movement: Impressionism; Academicism
- Spouse: Henri Guérard (m. 1879)
- Children: Jean Raimond Guérard

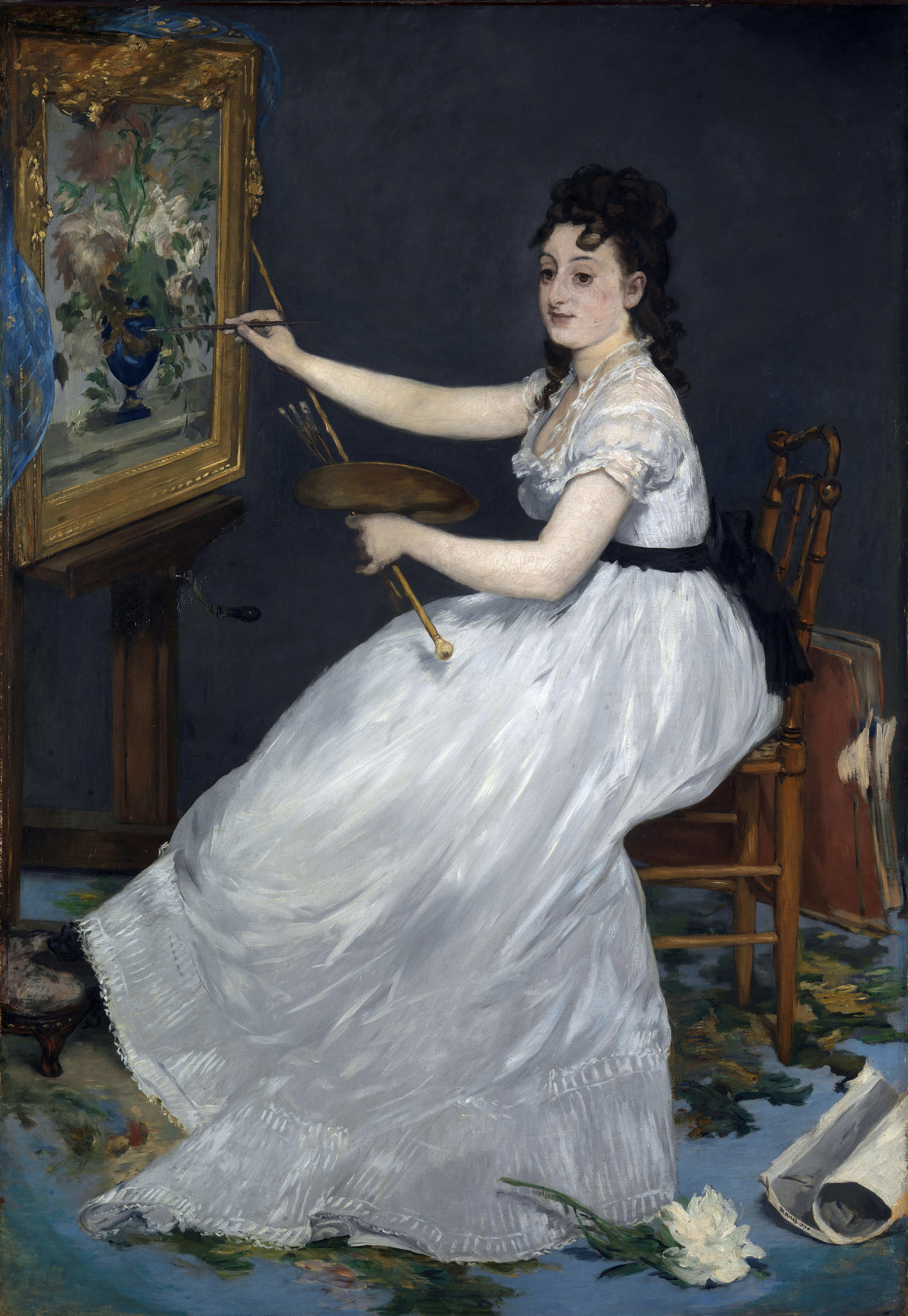
Portrait of Eva Gonzalès, 1869–70, by Édouard Manet

Eva Gonzalès (19 April 1847 – 6 May 1883) was a French Impressionist painter. She was one of the four most notable female Impressionists in the nineteenth century, along with Mary Cassatt (1844–1926), Berthe Morisot (1841–95), and Marie Bracquemond (1840–1916).

== Early life ==
Gonzalès was born in Paris and became introduced to sophisticated literary and art circles at an early age by her father, writer Emmanuel Gonzalès. In 1865, at age sixteen, Eva Gonzalès began her professional training and art lessons in drawing from the society portraitist Charles Chaplin.

Through her father's connections as a founding president of the Société des gens de lettres, she met a variety of members of the Parisian cultural elite, and from a young age was exposed to the new ideas surrounding art and literature at the time. Three years later she met Manet and soon became his model and then his student.

== Student of Édouard Manet ==
Gonzalès is best known for her starting out as a pupil of the artist Édouard Manet in February 1869. This relationship was formed by poor reviews that Manet received about his Salon entries, which made him hesitant to openly discuss his work; however, something about Eva's presence brought Manet out of his shell.

In Portrait of Eva Gonzalès, Manet depicts her working at an easel, yet her stiff posture and expensive dress are clearly unfit for creating artwork. This depiction of her likely caused some critics to perceive her simply as a young, decorative model who was working with an older established male painter. Gonzalès was Manet's only formal student and also modeled for several members of the Impressionist school. Manet's Mlle E.G. was discussed more than Gonzalès' oeuvre at her own 1885 retrospective and at the Galerie Daber's exhibition for her work in 1950.

== Career and later life ==
Gonzalès' work was celebrated by Salon reviewers for the inherent intuition with which she approached art, as well as her technical skill. At one point she listed herself as a student of Charles Chaplin with her submissions to the Salon, perhaps as a method to be taken more seriously. Much of her work became characterized through Salon reviews with the discussion of her "feminine technique" and her "seductive harmony". However, her large-scale painting, Box at the Théâtre des Italiens (1874), was characterized by the Salon jury as having "masculine vigor", which led them to reject it with questions as to her painting's authenticity. It was accepted by the Salon of 1879.

Nevertheless, her work was reviewed positively by a variety of critics. Louis Leroy, Jules Castagnary, and Émile Zola praised the work she successfully showed at the Salons. Furthermore, the art critic Maria Deraismes championed Gonzalés for producing paintings which challenged the way female painters were viewed and separated from the art scene in Paris.

Like Manet, Gonzalès did not exhibit in the Impressionist exhibitions but is considered part of the group because of her painting style. While studying under Manet, Gonzalès' self-portraits suggest that she was exploring her individuality and identity as an artist by presenting subtle correctives to Manet's version of her. Until 1872, she was strongly influenced by Manet but later developed her own, more personal style. This can be seen in works such as Enfant de Troupe (1870), which is a nod to Manet's Le Fifre (1866), while many of her later paintings involved portraits of her sister, Jeanne. It was common of Eva Gonzalès to use her family members, particularly her husband and her sister, Jeanne Gonzalès, as models in her work.

During the Franco-Prussian War she sought refuge in Dieppe. In 1879, after a three-year engagement, she married Henri Guérard, a graphic artist and Manet's engraver. The couple had a son named Jean Raimond in April 1883, shortly before receiving news of the death of Manet.

Her work was exhibited at the offices of the art review L'Art in 1882 and at the Galerie Georges Petit in 1883. Today, one of Eva Gonzalès' most notable works is A Loge in the Théàtre des Italiens (1874; Musée d'Orsay, Paris) which is "described as one of the most provocative paintings of its day..."

== Death ==
In 1883, Gonzalès died in childbirth at the age of thirty-six, five days after the death of her teacher, Edouard Manet, which left her son to be raised by his father and her sister, Jeanne, who later became Guerard's second wife. Since her death, exhibitions of Gonzales work were held at the Salons de La Vie Moderne (1885), the Salon d'Automne (1907), at several galleries in Paris. Her work has been exhibited in 1952 at the Musée National des Beaux-Arts, Monte Carlo.

== Accomplishments ==
Eva Gonzalès' paintings have been purchased by the French government along with private collectors. Out of all her works, the broadest representation of her oeuvre can be spotted in the collection of her son and his heirs. Some other accomplishments that she has had throughout her career, include the newspaper L'Art purchasing her pastels and receiving recognition in England, Belgium, and France.

In the mid-1870s, Gonzalès started experimenting with pastels, which allowed her work to stand as finished pieces. They may be her most successful works, as she is a figure in the impressionist movement. Before dying in childbirth at age 36, Gonzalès showed her work at a number of important group shows.

== Bibliography ==
- Bayle, Paule, "Eva Gonzales," La Renaissance, June 1932.
- Mathey, Francois, Six femmes peintres, Paris, 1951, 8.
- Monaco, Eva Gonzales exposition, catalog by Claude Roger -Marx, 1952.
- Moreau- Nelaton, E.., Manet raconte par luimeme, Paris, 1926, I.
- Paris, Salons de la Vie Moderne, Catalogue des peintures et pastels de Eva Gonzales, preface by Philippe Burty, essay by Theodore de Banville, 1885.
- Paris, Galerie Bernheim-Jeune, Eva Gonzales, 1914.
- Paris, Galerie Marcel Bernheim, Eva Gonzales, exposition retrospective, catalog by Paul Bayle, 1932.
- Paris, Galerie Daber, Eva Gonzales retrospective, catalog by Alfred Daber, 1959.
- Roger-Marx, Claude, Eva Gonzales, short essay by Theodore de Banville, Paris, 1950.
- Little Soldier

Exhibitions:

- Salon of 1870: Eva Gonzales retrospective,
- Galerie Daber, Paris, 1959.

Literature:

- Karl Berrand, "Salon de 1870", L' artiste,
- April–June 1870, 319; Roger-Marx, n.p.,
- Rewald, 240-41 and note 4, 268; Genevieve Lacambre and Jacqueline Rohan-Chabot, Le Musee de Luxembourg en 1874, Paris, 1974.

== Gallery ==
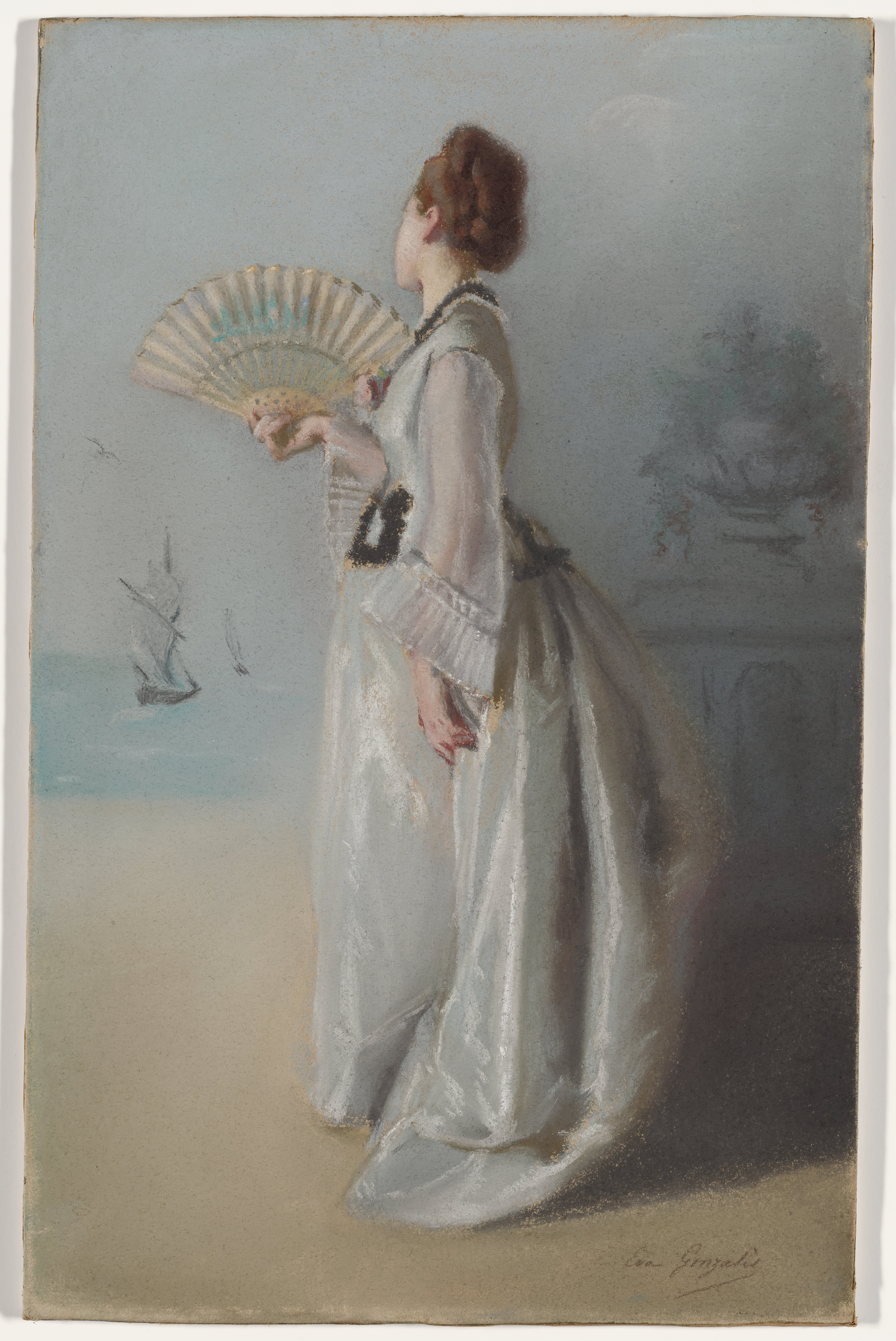
Lady with a Fan, 1869–70

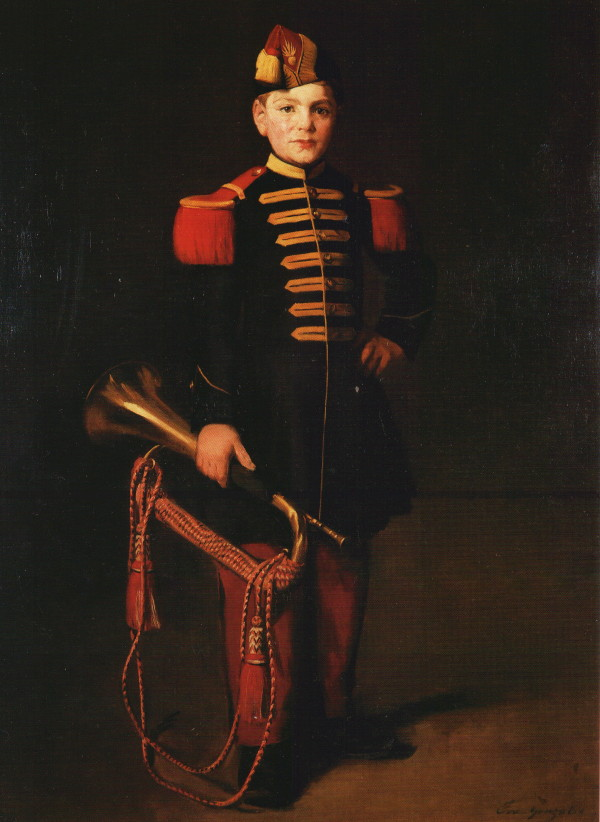
Enfant de troupe (The Little Soldier), 1870

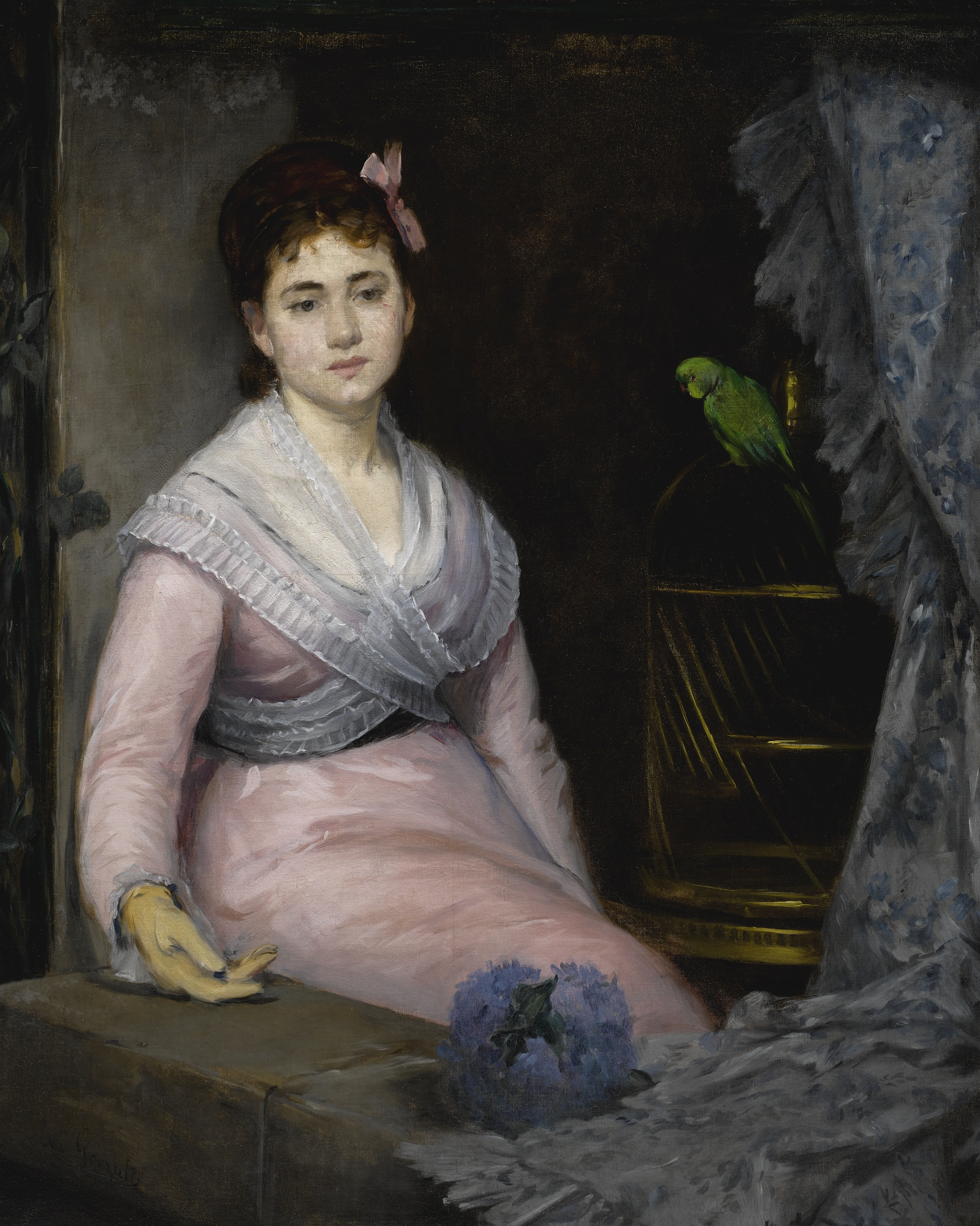
L'Indolence, 1871–72

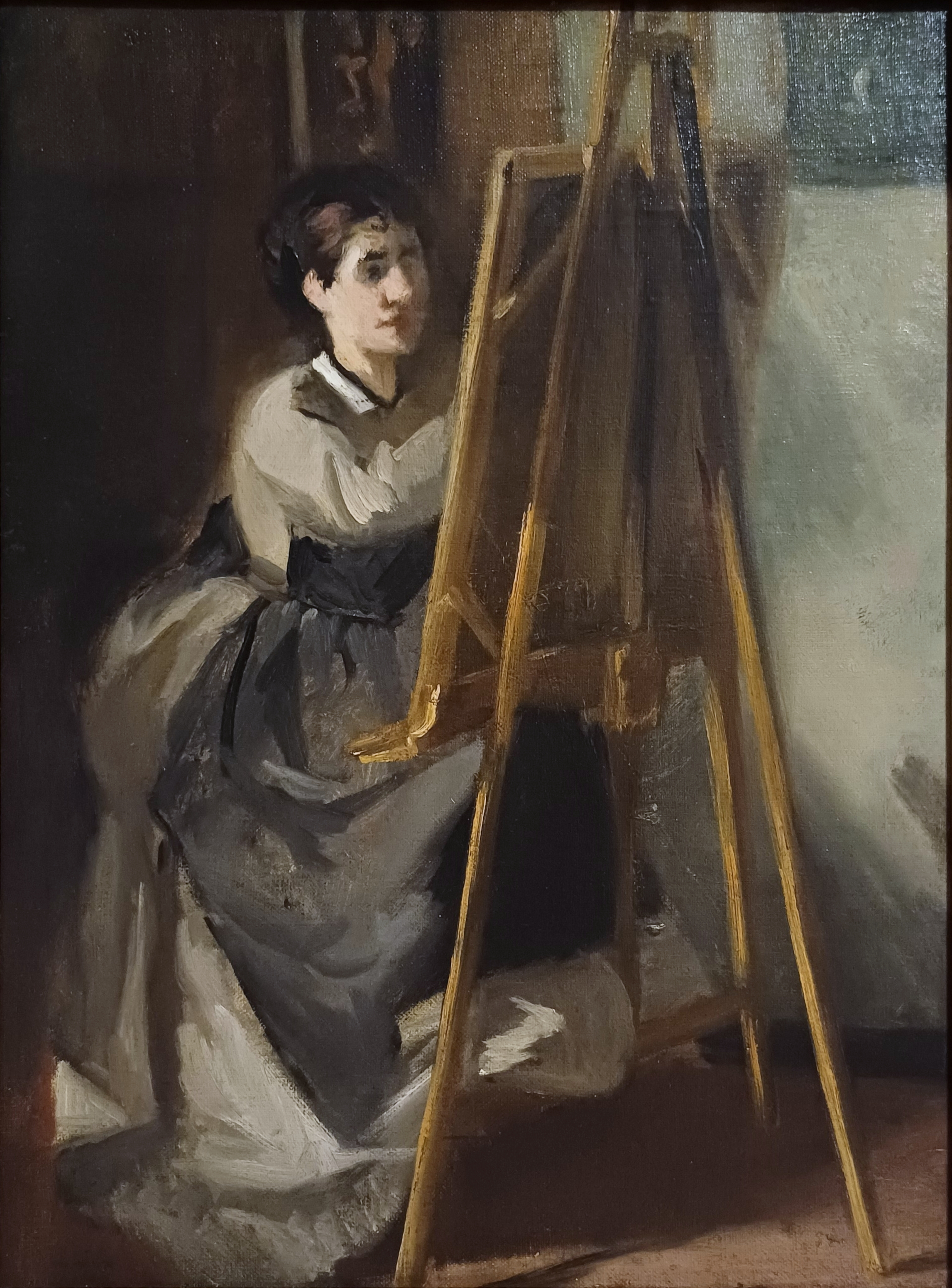
La jeune élève (Portrait of Sister as Artist) 1871–72

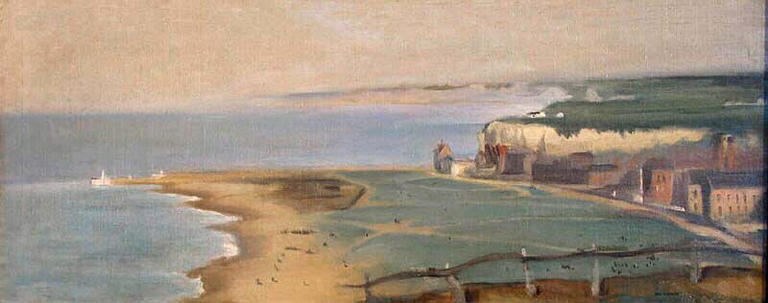
Plage de Dieppe, vue depuis la falaise Ouest ( Dieppe Beach towards the west cliffs), 1871

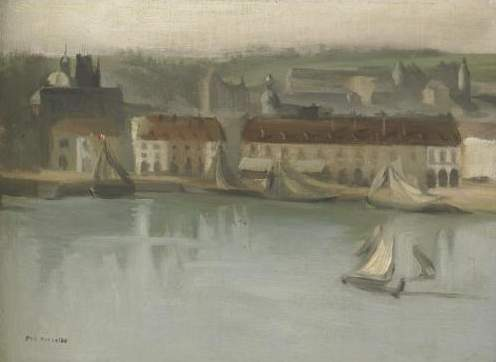
L'Avant Port (Dieppe) ( The Front Port), c. 1871

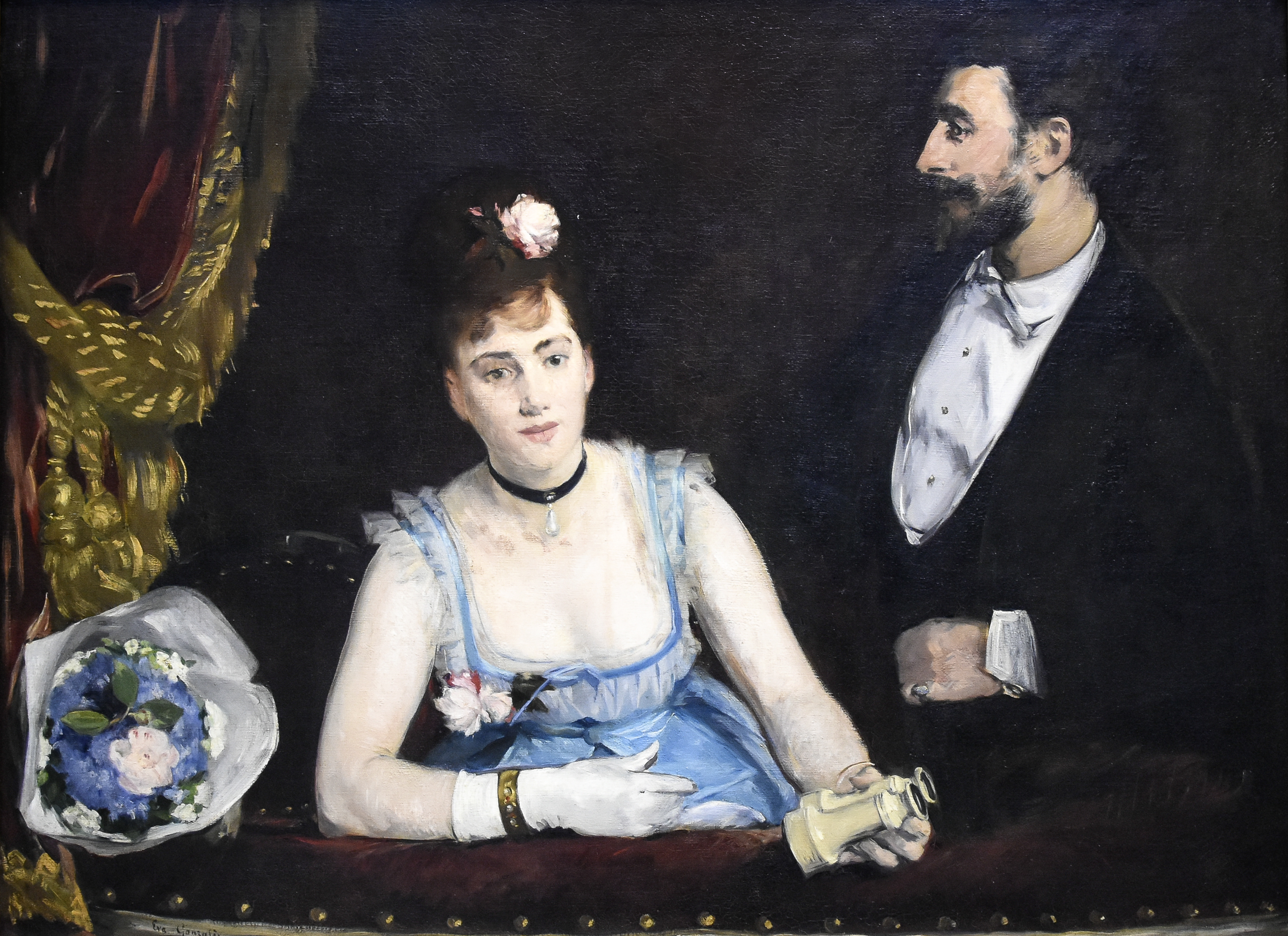
Une loge aux Théâtre Italiens, 1874

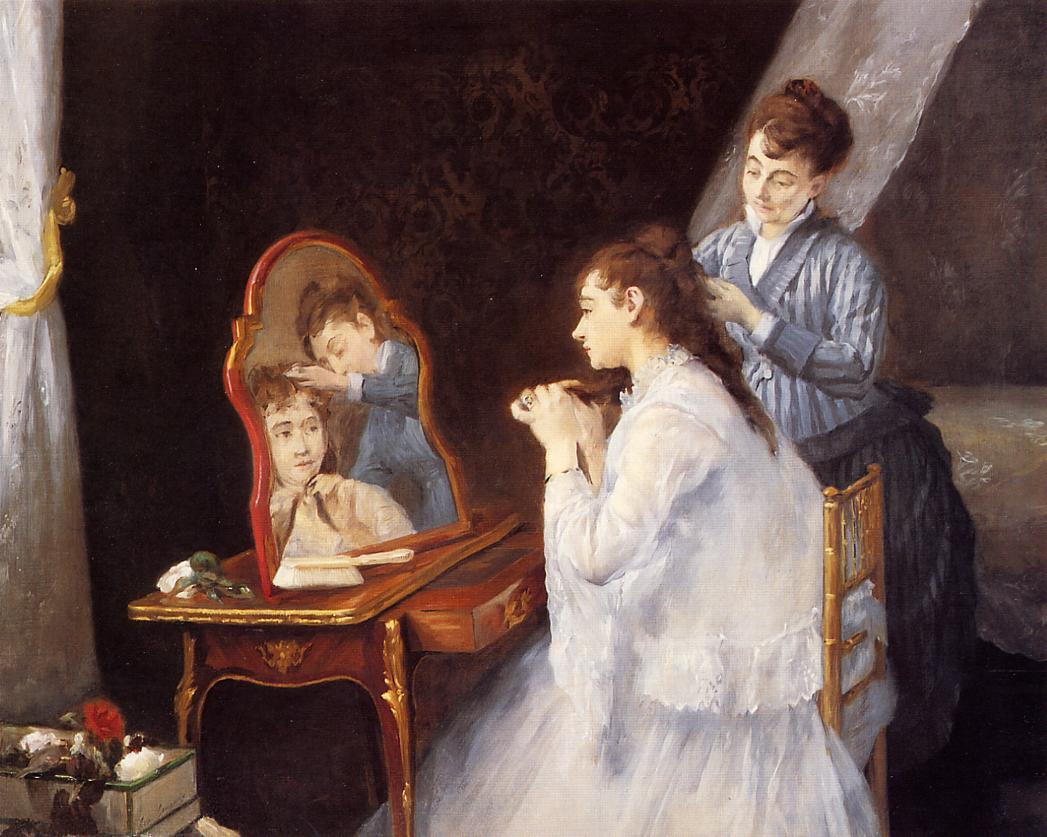
Le petit lever (The Little Lever), 1875

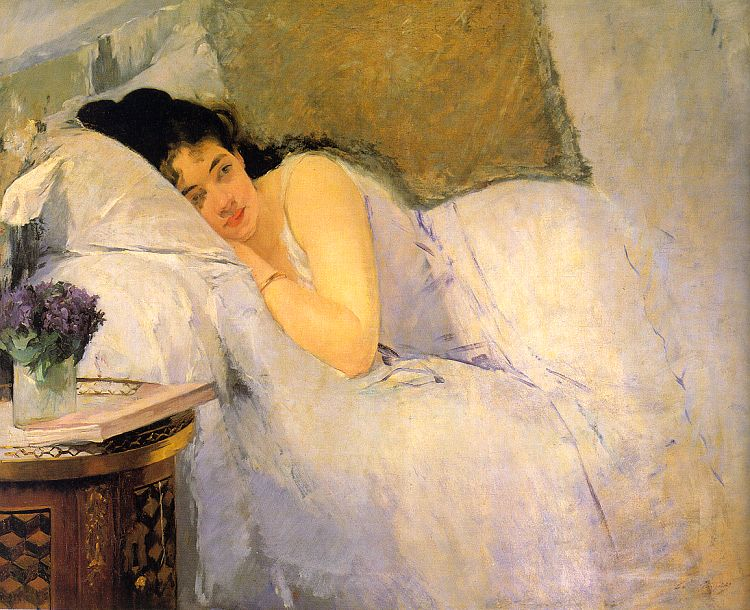
Morning Awakening, 1876

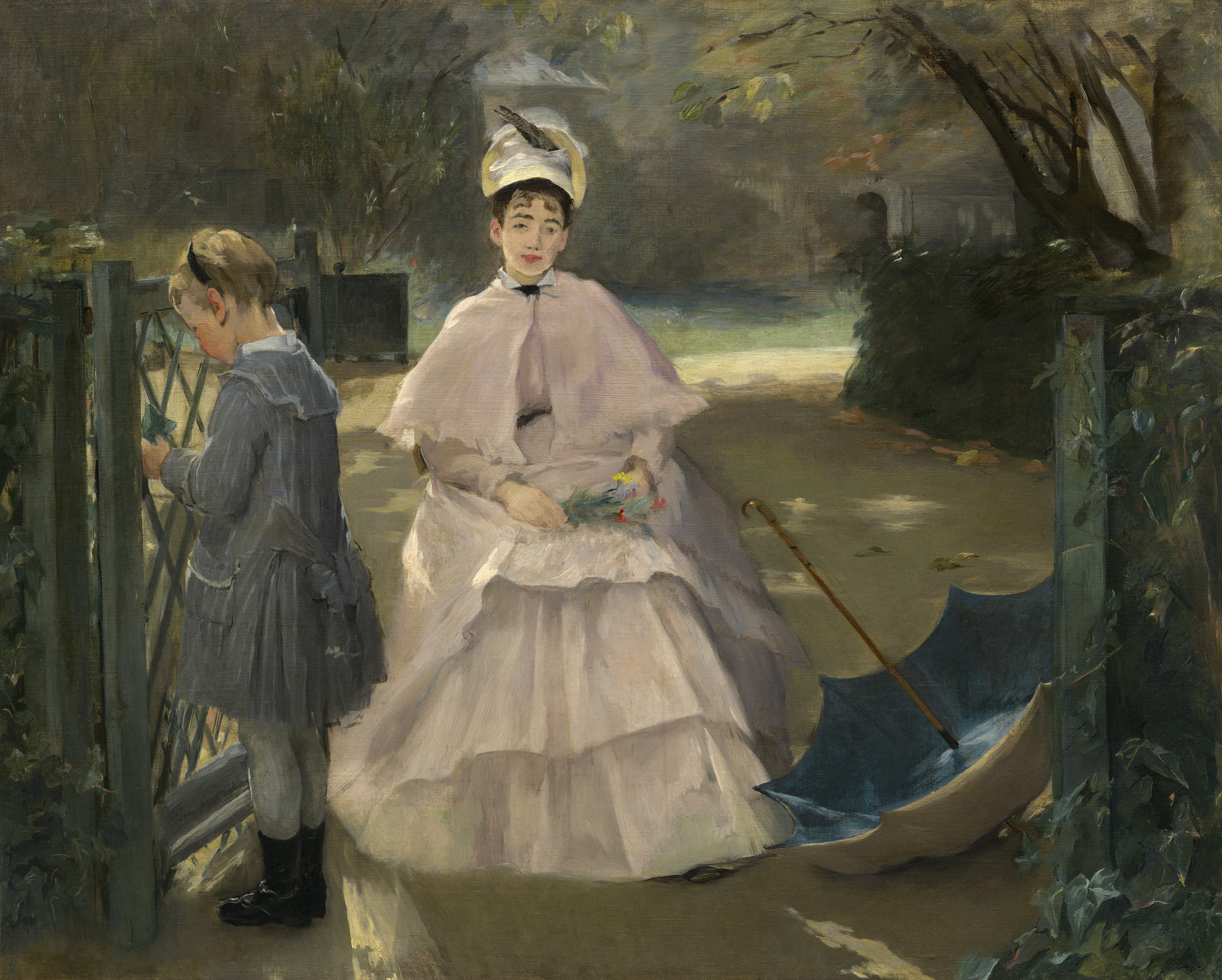
Nounou avec enfant ( Nanny with a child), 1877–78

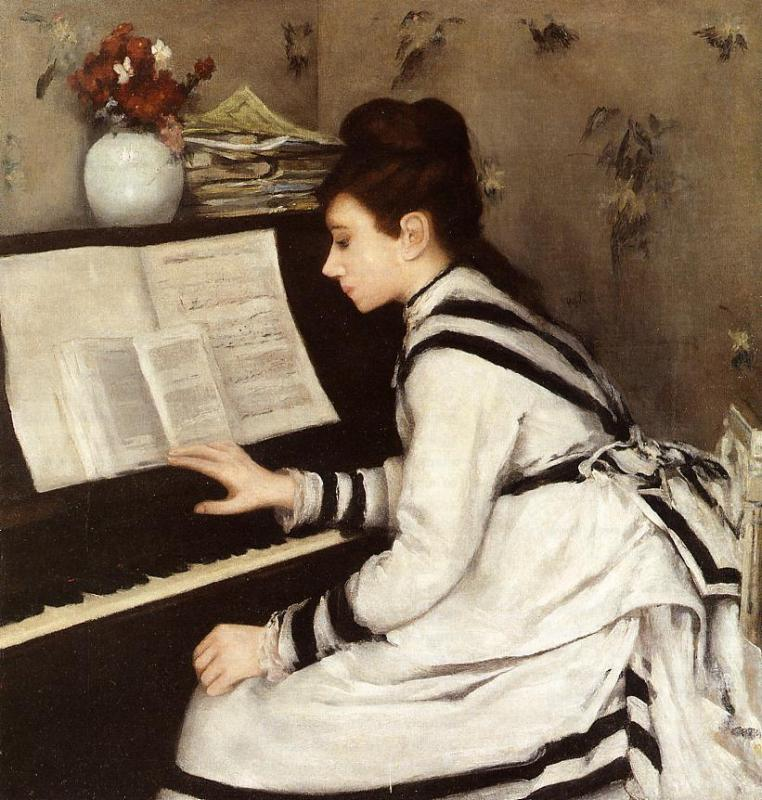
Secretly, 1877–78

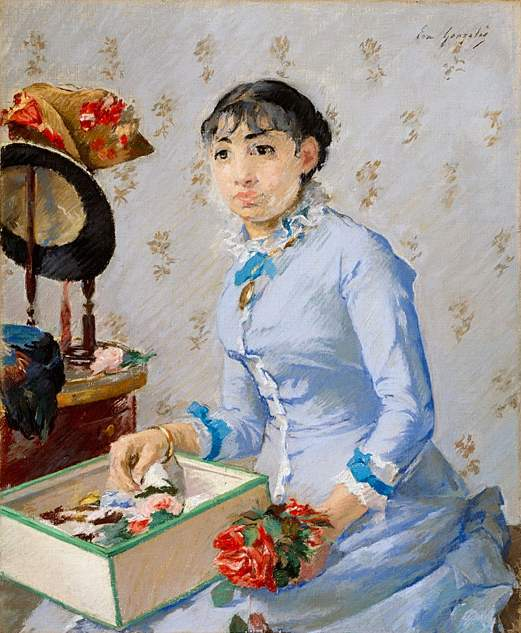
The Milliner, c. 1877

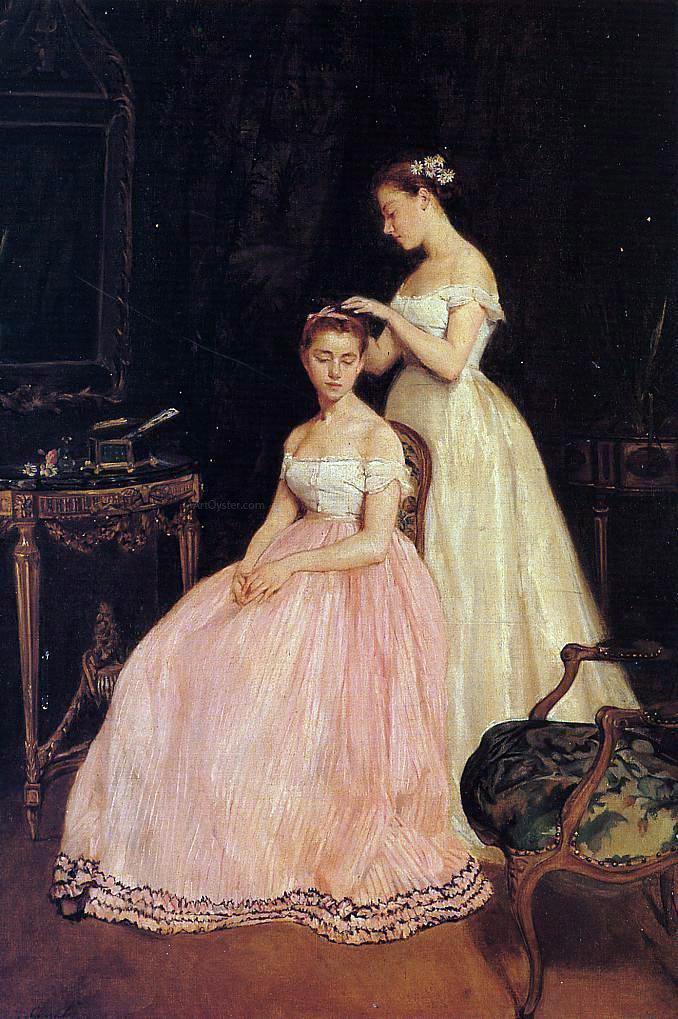
La Toilette, 1879

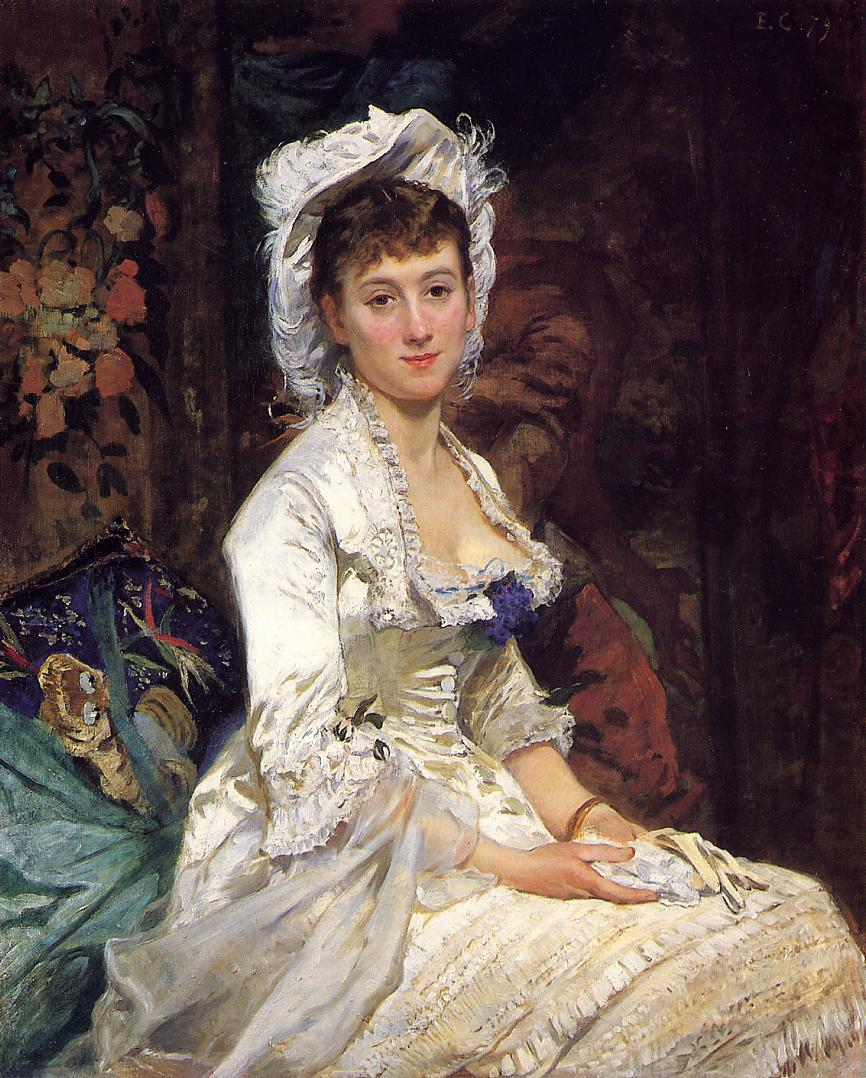
Portrait of a Woman in White, 1879

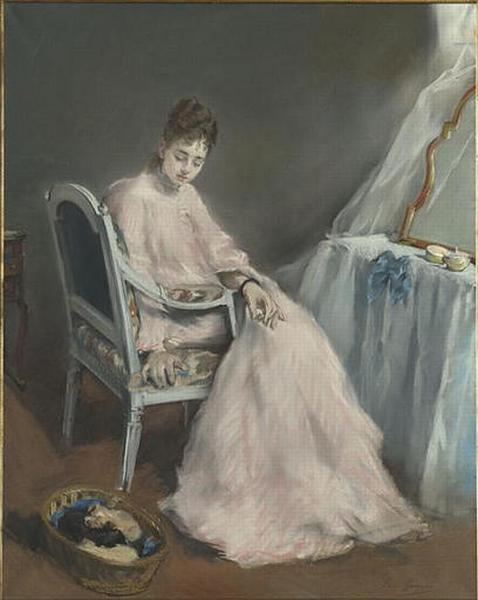
Woman in White, 1879

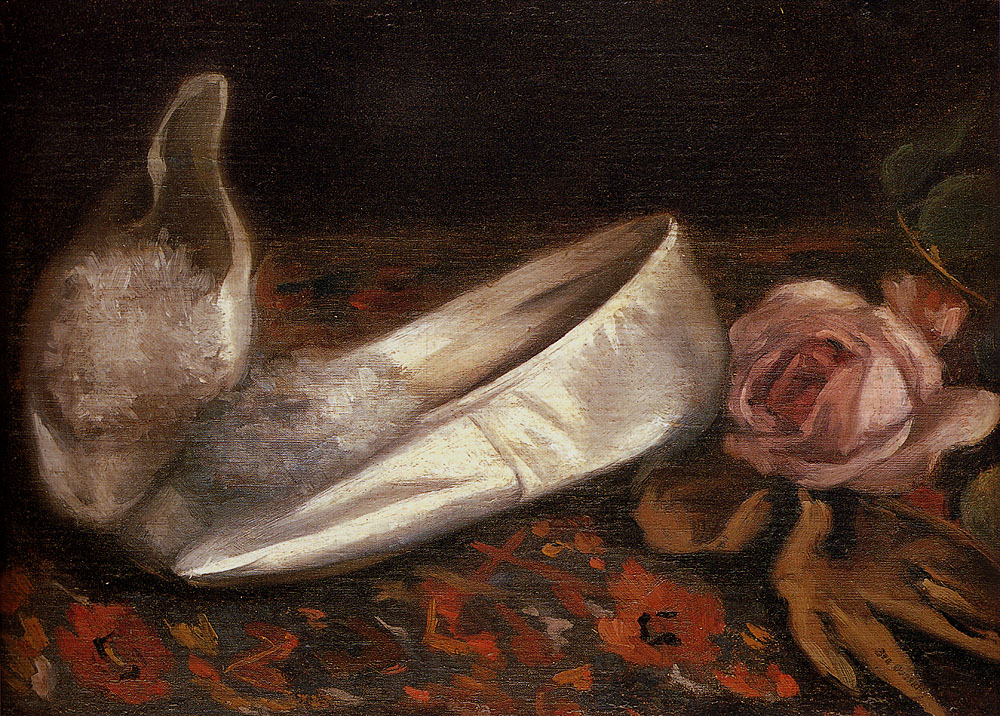
White Shoes, 1879–80

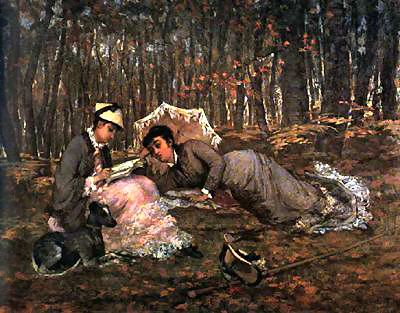
Reading in the Forest, 1880

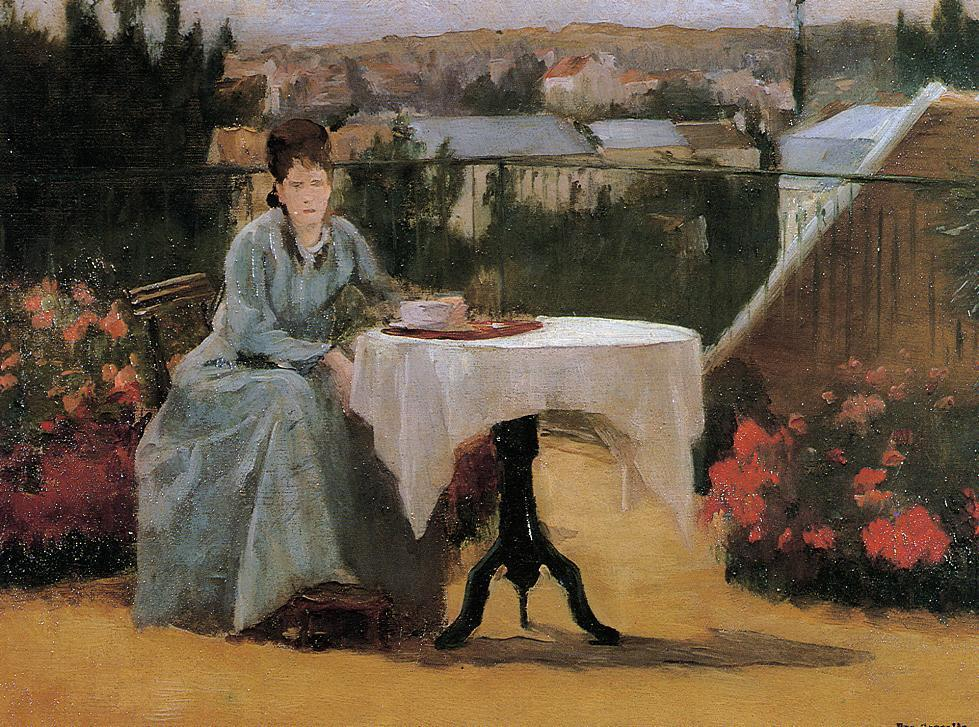
Afternoon Tea, or On the Terrace, 1875

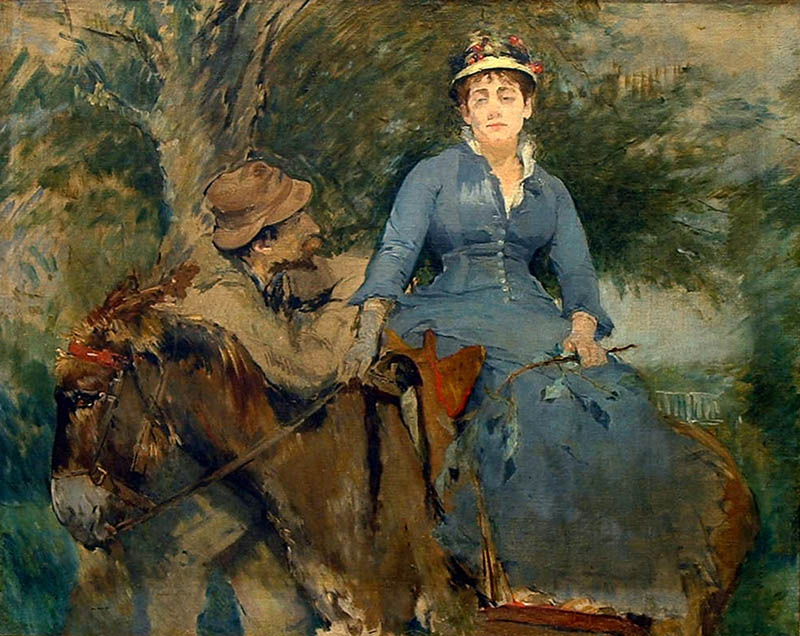
The Donkey Ride, 1880

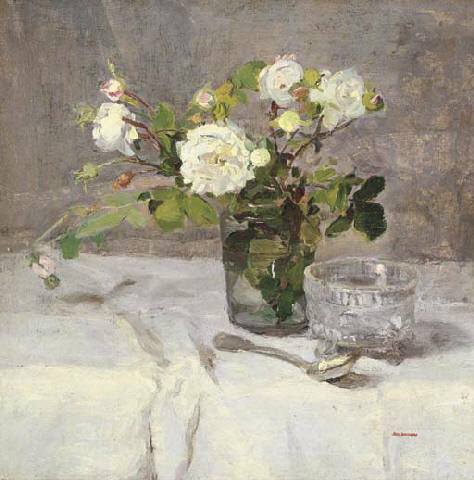
Roses dans un verre( Roses in a Glass), 1880–82

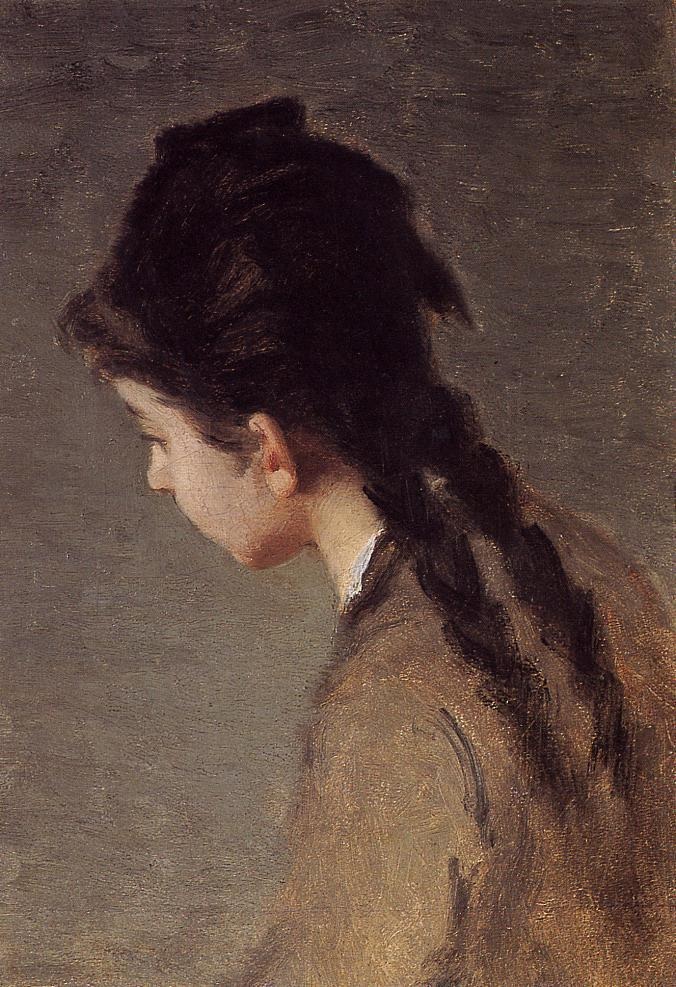
Portrait of Jeanne Gonzalès in Profile

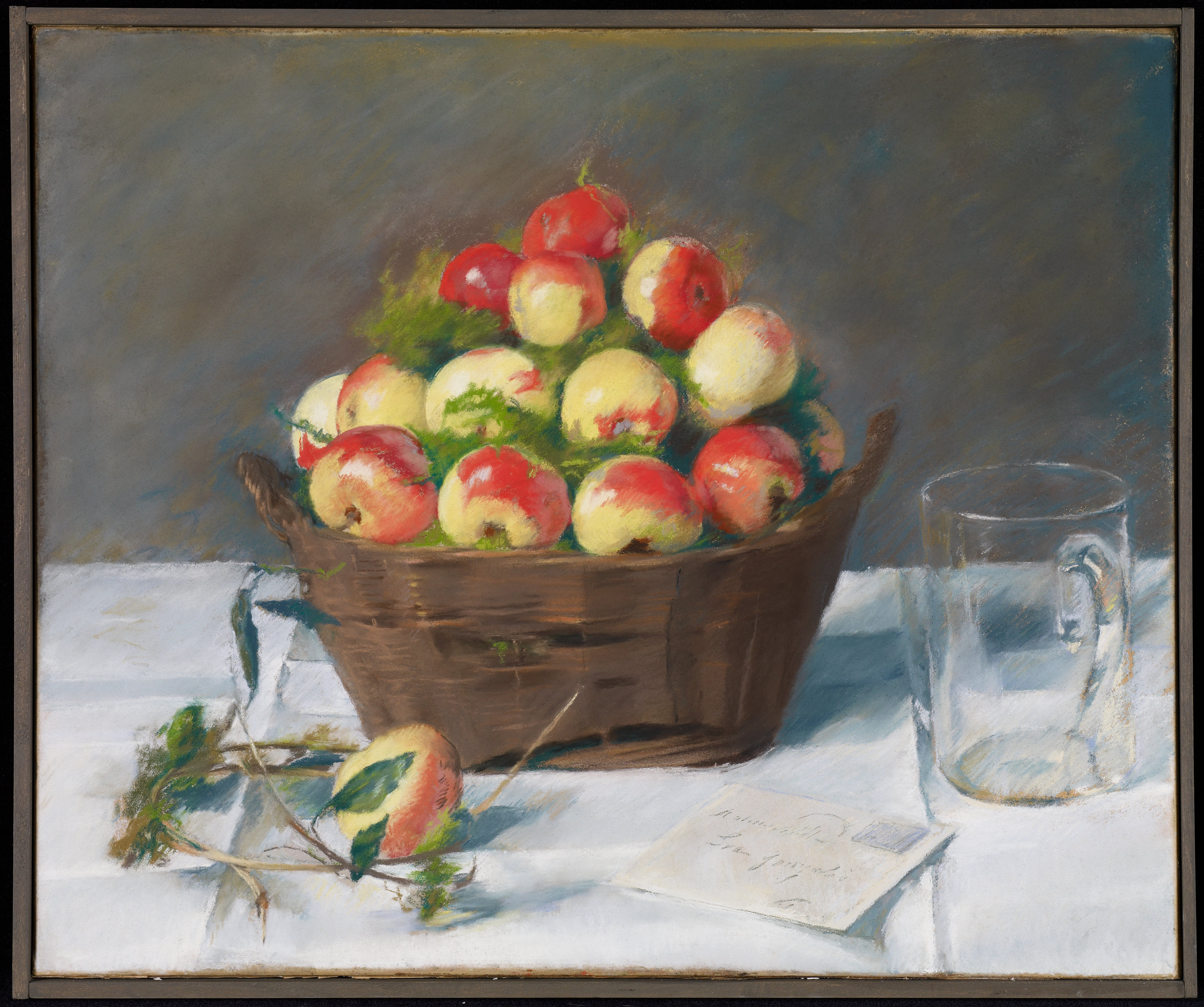
Pommes d'Api ( Sweet Apples), 1877–78

== Selected exhibitions ==
Selected Eva Gonzalès Solo Exhibitions	Date
Paris, Salons de la Vie moderne. Catalogue des peintres et pastels de Eva Gonzalès.	1885, January
Paris, Galerie Berhneim-Jeune. Eva Gonzalès.	1914, March–April
Paris, Galerie Marcel Bernheim. Eva Gonzalès, retrospective.	1932. June 20 – July 9
Paris, Alfred Daber. Eva Gonzalès.	1950. March 10 – April 1
Principauté de Monaco. Sporting. Eva Gonzalès.	1952, March 3–23
Paris. Galerie Daber. Eva Gonzalès retrospective.	1959, May 28 – June 3
Also had many group exhibitions, often with Berthe Morisot and Mary Cassatt.	
