= The Tea =

Painting by Mary Cassat

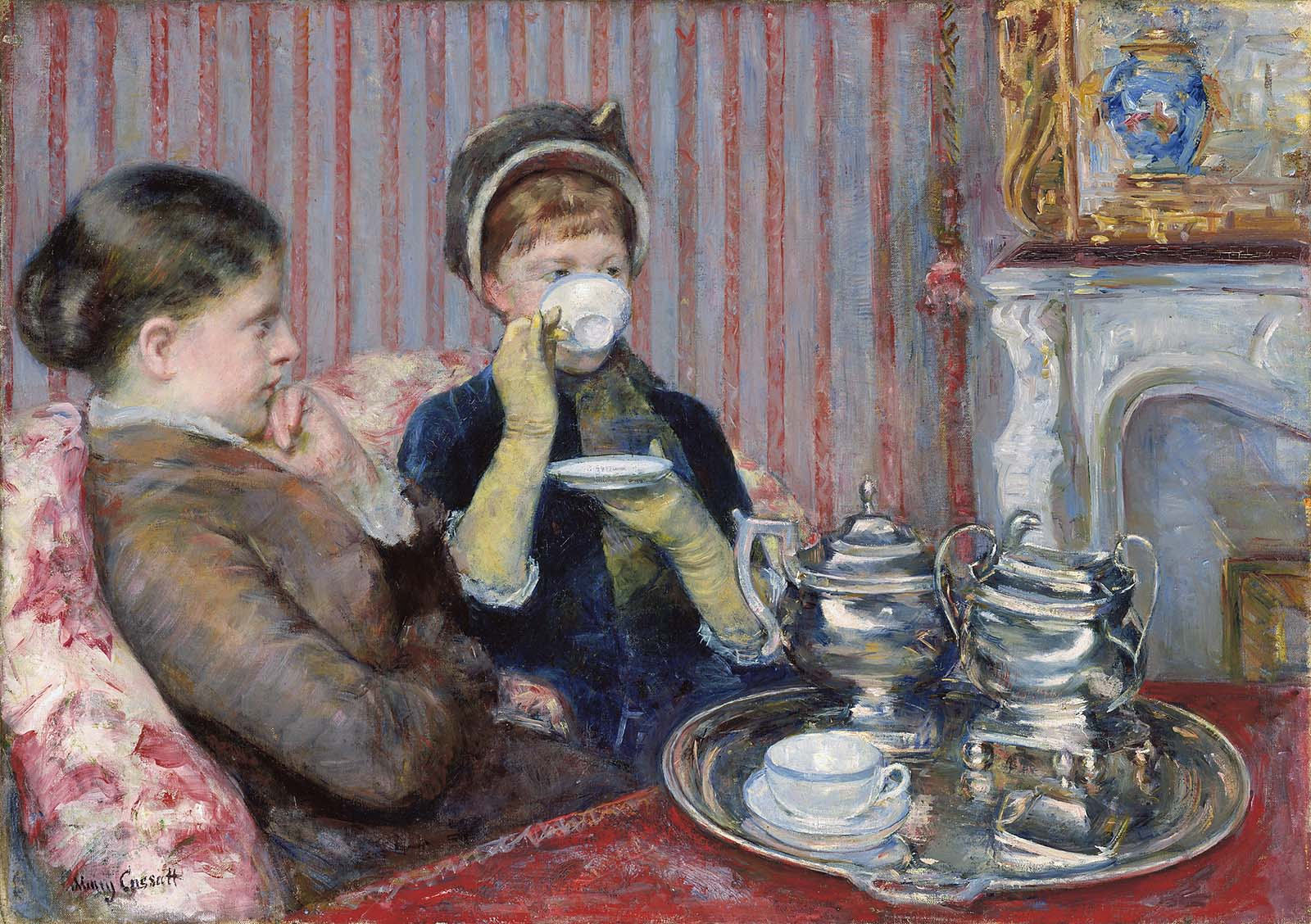
- Artist: Mary Cassatt
- Year: 1879–1880
- Medium: Oil on canvas
- Location: Museum of Fine Arts, Boston

The Tea, also referred to as Five O'Clock Tea, is an oil-on-canvas painting of two women having tea by the American Impressionist painter Mary Cassatt. The role of gender in the painting has been the subject of differing interpretations among art historians. Griselda Pollock describes the confined interior as an evocation of the spatial and social constraints placed on women at the time. Norma Broude asks whether the work might contain "possibilities for empowerment," showing the agency that women exercised through sociability. And John Loughery argues that the intention behind Cassatt's work might always remain a mystery.

== Context ==
Art historians and feminist scholars such as Broude emphasize that Cassatt's work must be viewed within the context of her time. Cassatt's work reflects the fact that she did not have the same access to the public sphere as her male counterparts. While male artists were able to explore busy streets, music halls, cafes, and travel, Cassatt's experiences were limited to the domestic sphere, therefore, also limiting her choice of subjects.

== Description and analysis ==
The art historian Sinéad Furlong-Clancy suggests that Cassatt's painting contains a "sense of compression" as a result of the "heavily furnished setting," including drawing room with a carved marble fireplace, the wallpaper, the floral coach, a gilt-framed mirror, a porcelain vase, and a table with the silver tea set. According to Furlong-Clancy, "the dominant hues of mauve and red of the interior are lightened by the mirror and fireplace, and the tea service." The "chic and understated" attire of the navy dress, gloves, and bonnet contrast with the "garishly decorated interior." The silver tea set (which is also conserved at the MFA) "takes pride of place" in the scene. Furlong-Clancy argues that the setting is not a completely private space, but rather it is a semi-private space of socialization and entertainment. Both women are shown in informal poses; the guest's face is obscured while drinking her tea and the hostess' profile is shown while she rests her face on her hand with her empty cup sitting on the table. Furlong-Clancy explains that Cassatt is capturing a moment of disconnection, post-conversation between the two women. The over abundance of interior decoration and the large tea set on the table compress the women together, adding to the awkwardness of the scene. Furlong-Clancy explains that the artist is allowing the viewer to decide whether this is a "small hiatus in conversation or a social visit tinged with awkwardness."

According to Pollock, The Tea portrays a "scene of bourgeois sociability." Cassatt places the viewer right across the table from the women, close enough to see every detail and feel the tension between the two. Cassatt does not allow either woman to "become mere additional prettiness, a form displaying feminine beauty, or even illustrating female social intimacies." Pollock suggests that there is an interlocutor that the viewer cannot see engaging them in conversation. Our inability to see the full scene, forces us instead to be "observers of detail" focussed on the furniture, table settings, and fashion in the painting. While the subjects' faces are obscured, the viewer still tries to make out their characters and personalities. Pollock notes that Cassatt's decision to cover the visitor's face with a cup of tea is ironic and "a daring move on the painter's part." Pollock also proposes that while the dresses worn by the women show an awareness and interest in fashion, "the dresses stretch to insist on substantial bodies straining the fine seams." Cassatt, according to Pollock, "radically reconceptualized" three spaces:

the spaces of femininity—the social locus and activity that is being painted; space in painting—the repression of deep space in favor of shallow space, producing the effect of immediate proximity to her sitters; and the space from which the painting was being made. This was her artistic and imaginative space, which occupied, by a self-consciously woman artist, renders the viewing position we are offered a historically and psychologically feminine one.

Pollock concludes by explaining that in order "to see these paintings historically, the viewer needs to recognize the position from which the artist produced them."

Broude argues that Cassatt uses the painting to address the changing and challenging ways in which French and American societies viewed gender and femininity. According to Broude, The Tea carries "ambiguity of meaning and mood and intention, a challenging resistance to any singular or conventional interpretation, which becomes more evident and more problematic for early-21st-century viewers." Broude challenges viewers to consider all the complexities and possibilities of The Tea, asking if the painting is "a sentimentalized but essentially straightforward view of women's traditional place within the rites of bourgeois domesticity? Or was it meant to be read in the 19th century—and should we read it today—as an image of the middle-class woman's narrow imprisonment within the home? Or might we more profitably read it as an image of the modern woman's networks of sociability and the possibilities for empowerment that these networks could provide?"

Art critic John Loughery says that Cassatt's composition creates discomfort and causes "serious questioning" among viewers. Loughery explains that these feelings arise from Cassatt's depiction of "the too-imposing silver tea service thrust towards the viewer, the odd absence from view of the woman the two guests are speaking to, the raised teacup that obscures (muzzles?) one of the women, the radical variations and brush work." However, Loughery is uncertain as to whether a deep analysis "exposing layers of plausible meaning" is justifiable or not. The art critic argues that "intention and technique can be so subtle that we search for depths that are not there, rather than simply appreciate what is." Loughery suggests that Cassatt's true intention behind The Tea may never fully be known.

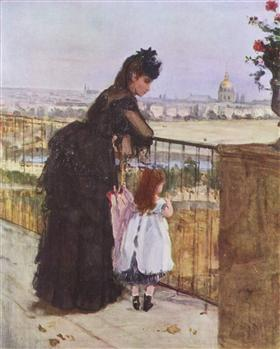
Berthe Morisot, On the Balcony, 1872. The painting depicts a mother and daughter "confined to the domestic sphere, fenced off from the public life of the city that lies beyond."

== Comparisons ==
=== Comparisons to other female artists ===
Broude offers a comparison between Cassatt's The Tea and Berthe Morisot's On the Balcony, saying that the lack of opportunity given to female artists during this time to explore beyond "these so-called 'spaces of femininity' have even been seen to impact compositionally on the carefully delimited spacial stages on which women artists often placed their female subjects." While many art spectators have a "reductive interpretation" and "essentialist view" of the artists' work, not considering the "ambivalence" of their paintings, Broude challenges viewers to consider the complexities.

=== Comparisons to male artists and authors ===
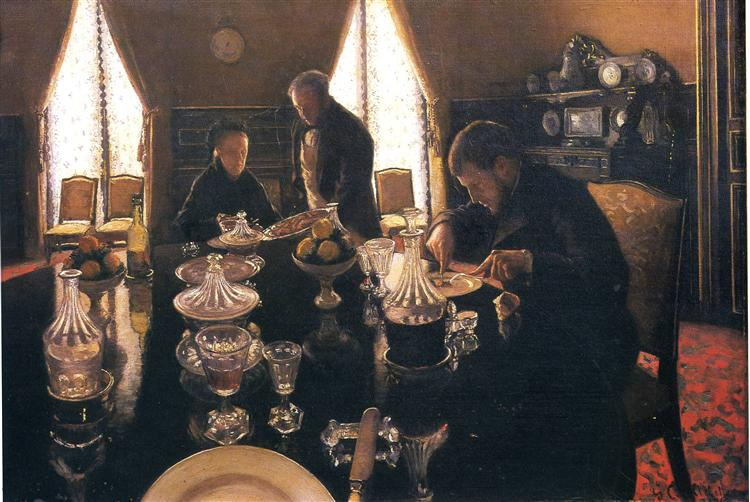
Gustave Caillebotte, Luncheon, 1876

John Loughery argues that while Cassatt's The Tea uses similar setting and subjects as explored in other literary and artistic works of the time, the emotional response Cassatt's painting evokes is different. For instance, compared to the work of American-British author Henry James and American artist William Merritt Chase, Loughery says that Cassatt's painting is "a good deal more mysterious, or at least less conventional, in its space and composition than numerous other genteel genre scenes." Unlike other late 19th-century works examining domestic space, Cassatt allows her viewers to feel unsettled towards her subjects and their conditions. Loughery admits uncertainty about whether Cassatt intended her work to stimulate such emotions and serve as a deep social commentary, questioning whether or not "Cassatt might have more in common with Renoir and Pissarro than the deeper Manet and Degas."

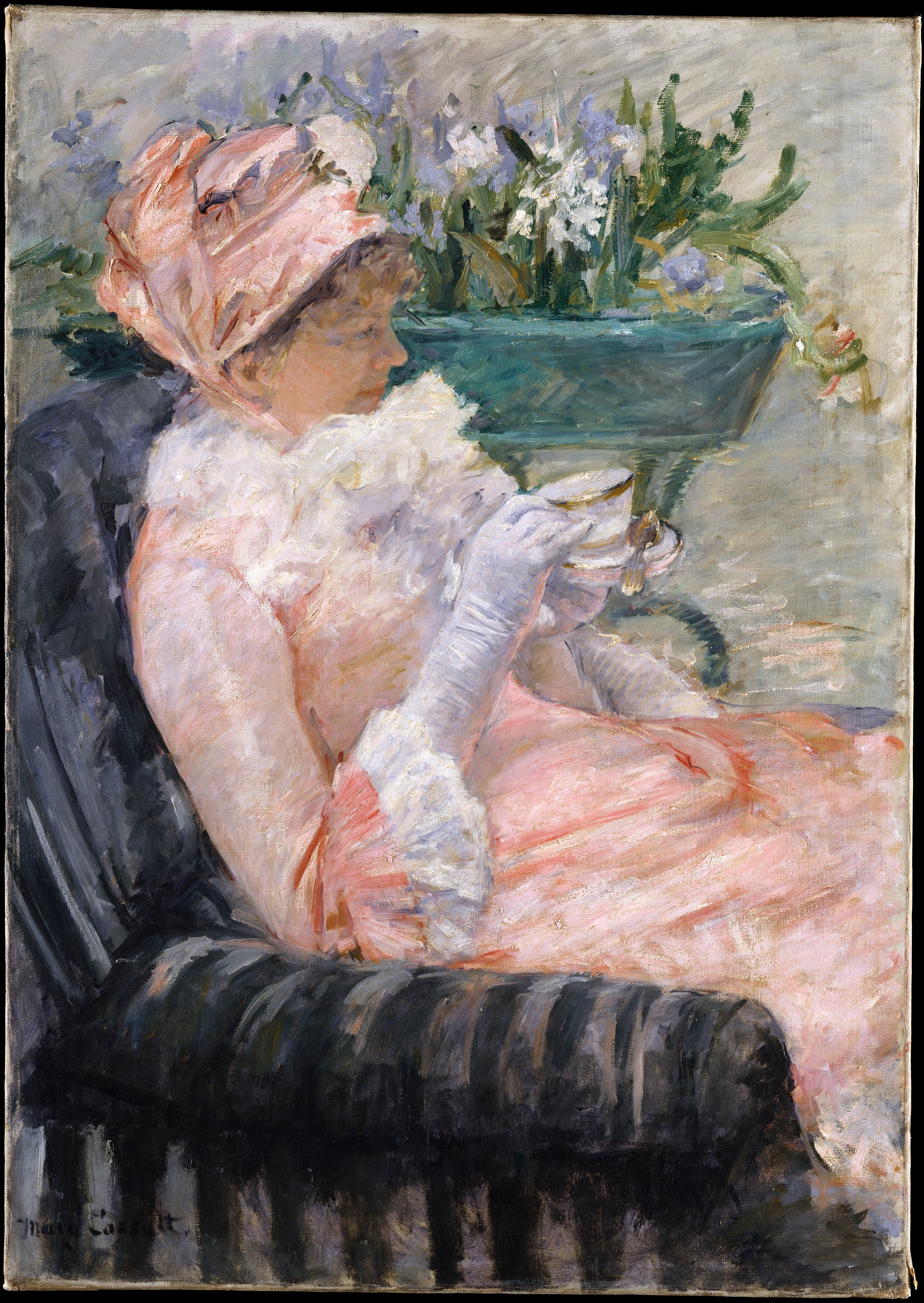
Mary Cassatt,The Cup of Tea, 1880–81

Furlong-Clancy also draws a connection between The Tea and Gustave Caillebotte's Luncheon (1876) which also depicts a bourgeois home full of expensive "silverware, glassware, and dining and entertaining formalities."

=== Comparisons to Cassatt's own work ===
Furlong-Clancy notes how Cassatt used her sister as the subject of many other works as well, such as The Reader (Lydia Cassatt) (c. 1878), Lydia at the Tapestry Frame (c. 1881), and The Cup of the Tea (c 1880-1). According to Furlong-Clancy, the tone of Cassatt's The Tea contrasts with the "light-filled airy quality" in her other works around the same subject, such as The Cup of the Tea.

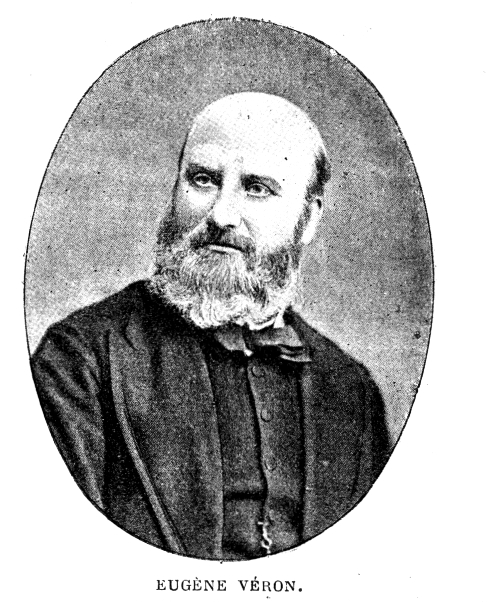
Eugène Véron

== Critical reception ==
Art historian Charles S. Moffett describes the drastically different ways in which Cassatt's painting was received by art critics during its time. "Conservative critics" such as Eugène Véron and Arthur Baignères heavily criticized most of Cassatt's art for its depiction of light and its effects. Véron faulted the artist for being "a colorist," saying that "she works to reproduce exactly certain effects of light, which are not always pleasing. Her Femme au théâtre [sic] includes reflections that are yellow, green, etc., that may be real, but are hardly agreeable to the eye."

However, many of the conservative critics, who were usually critical of Cassatt's work, "begrudgingly" admitted to liking The Tea. For example, Baignères wrote that even though "the facial expressions are completely neglected... the young woman seen at an angle in the foreground is well modeled in the light, with neither gimmick nor repoussoir."

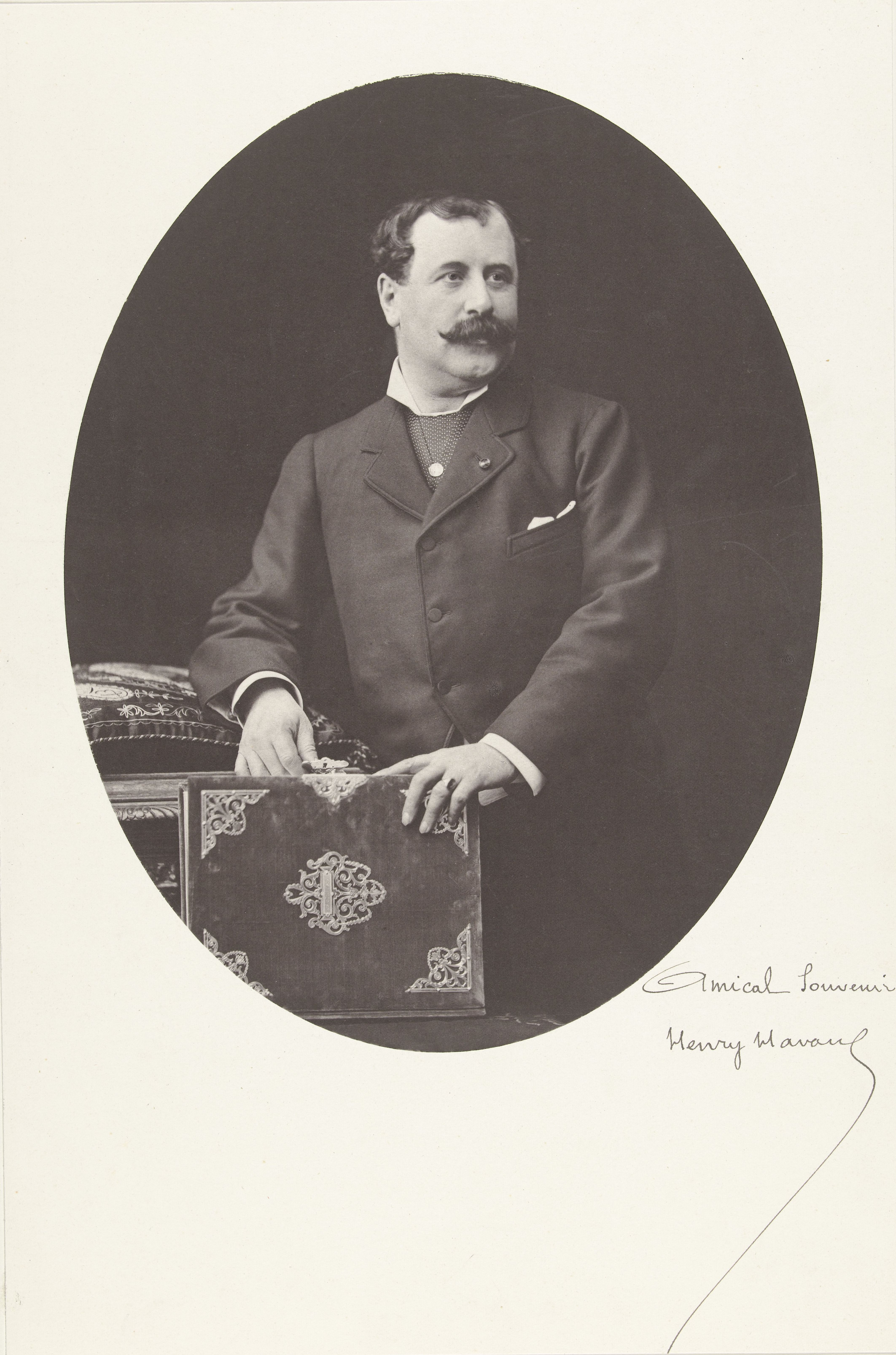
Henry Havard

Although the painting received a considerable amount of approval from critics, it also received some negative comments. Moffett notes that from "a purely academic point of view" Paul Mantz's description of the piece as "poorly drawn" is not warranted and "seems surprisingly capricious, but perhaps his strong admiration for such earlier artists as Delacroix prejudiced his interpretation of Cassatt's realistic Impressionism." Moffett finds Le Siècle critic Henry Havard's disapproval of The Tea to be more fair. Havard wrote in a criticism that "finally, Mary Cassatt was not the only one who has made compromises this year. Her talent remains alive, but her originality has abated. Of four portraits that she shows, only one is out of the ordinary; give her one or two more years, and you will see a lamb who will desert the fold and run with the wolves."

== See also ==
- List of works by Mary Cassatt
