= A Woman and a Girl Driving =

Painting by Mary Cassatt

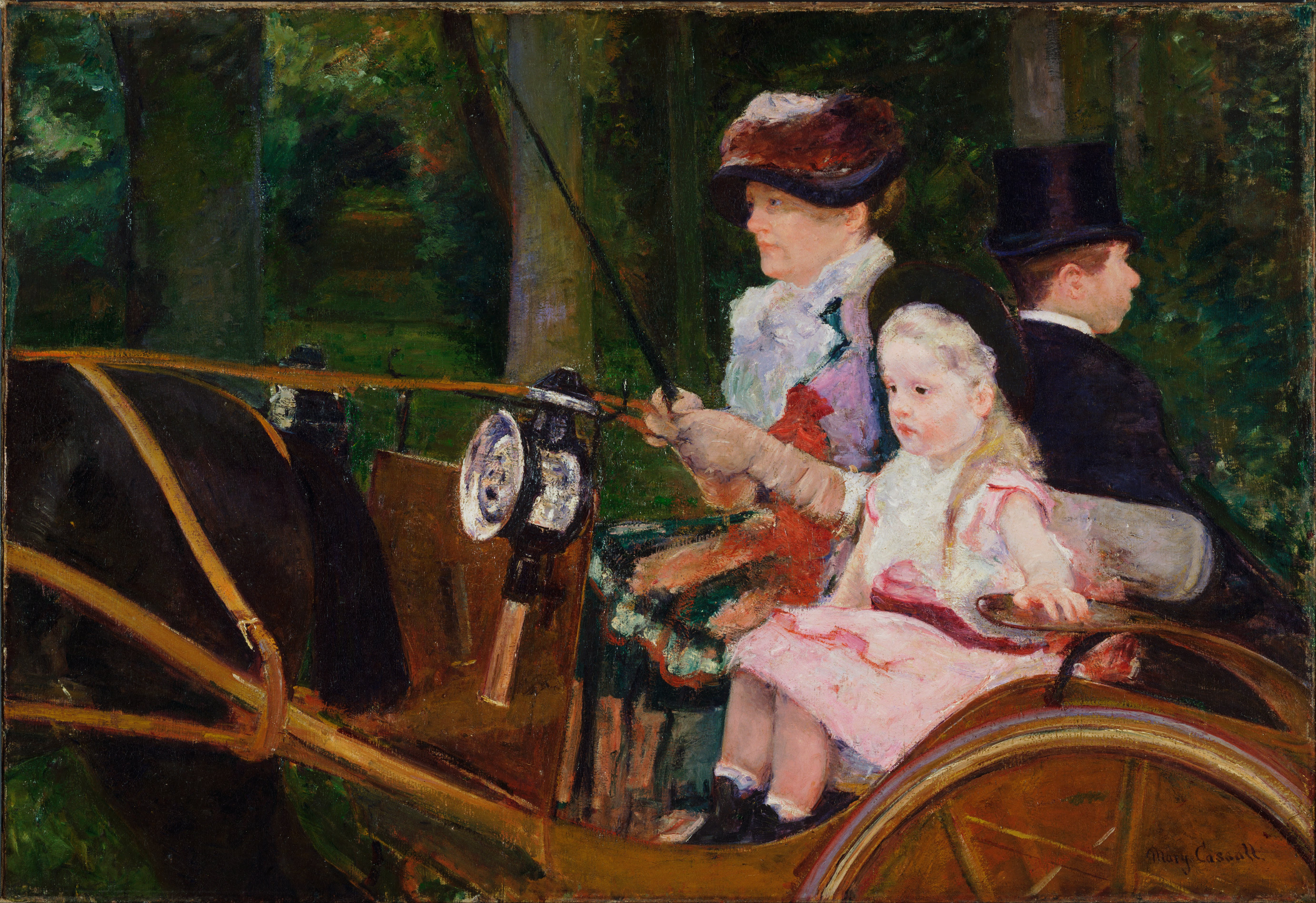
- Artist: Mary Cassatt
- Year: 1881
- Medium: Oil on canvas
- Dimensions: 89.7 cm × 130.5 cm (35.3 in × 51.4 in)
- Location: Philadelphia Museum of Art, Philadelphia

A Woman and a Girl Driving is an oil-on-canvas painting by American Impressionist Mary Cassatt, painted in 1881. It emphasizes the theme of female autonomy in a male dominated society. Lydia Cassatt, the artist's sister, is shown holding the reins of the family's carriage alongside Odile Fèvre, the niece of Edgar Degas, and a servant to the family, Mathieu, traveling through the Bois de Boulogne in Paris. Emphasizing Lydia's position of command, Cassatt draws attention to the evolving perceptions of female identity in the late 19th century. The painting serves to challenge prevailing social norms of the time and unveil the range of female experience.

The painting is one of the 83 works and letters by Cassatt currently held at the Philadelphia Museum of Art.

== Context ==
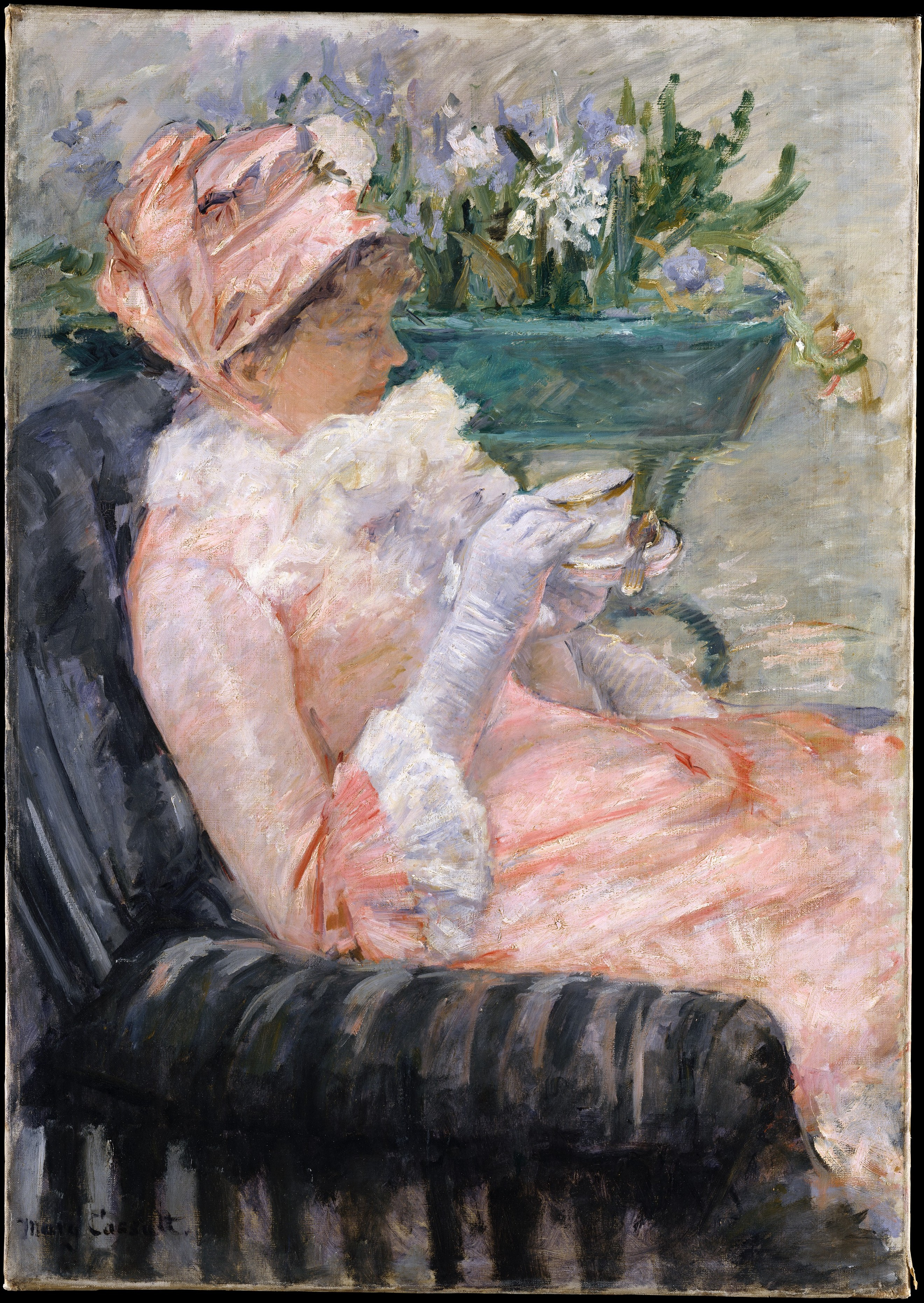
Featured as one of the works in the Impressionism Exhibit of 1881, The Cup of Tea is another example of Cassatt's use of asymmetrical composition as it depicts Lydia enjoying afternoon tea gazing into the distance with her opulent lifestyle in the background. The focal point is similar as it is not on her responsibilities, but rather her individuality.

Under Edgar Degas's mentorship, Cassatt had begun to exhibit with the Impressionists between the years of 1877 and 1881. Many of her works from this period featured independent women.

Cassatt portrayed her family's upper bourgeois lifestyle in a handful of her paintings, particularly those featured in the Impressionist Exhibition of 1881. The Cup of Tea, painted around the same time, is one such example. Lydia is once again presented through an asymmetrical perspective, drinking tea from a gold-edged cup, a luxury. The emphasis again is on her gaze, as she avoids direct contact with the viewer and is focused on the distance.

According to feminist art historian Norma Broude, Cassatt's body of work prioritizes female subjects, including her own mother and sister, to resist the patriarchal forms of femininity and stereotypical behaviors imposed on women.

== Analysis ==
In line with her Impressionist influences, Cassatt's work adopts an asymmetrical composition emphasizing Lydia's dominant role as the carriage driver in a familiar outing. The artistic techniques employed, including spatial compression, conspicuous brushwork, and use of color, likely reflect the influence of Degas.

Some scholars have seen symbolic significance in the backward direction of the man's gaze and the limited view of his face, which subordinates him to the female figures in the front of the carriage. According to these scholars, the decision to portray Lydia in control of the carriage challenged traditional gender norms of female subservience. As an experienced horsewoman, Cassatt knew how to depict her sister with appropriate posture, steady hand placement, and concentration on the road ahead rather than the child beside her.

Cassatt uses abrupt cropping, in keeping with Impressionist techniques. The unconventional vantage point and cropped forms give the painting the appearance of being an everyday scene, not a highly significant or staged event.

== See also ==
- List of works by Mary Cassatt
