= Little Girl in a Blue Armchair =

Painting by Mary Cassatt

- Petite fille dans un fauteuil bleu (French)
- Artist: Mary Cassatt
- Year: 1878
- Catalogue: BrCR 56
- Medium: Oil on canvas
- Dimensions: 89.5 cm × 129.8 cm (35.2 in × 51.1 in)
- Location: National Gallery of Art, Washington D.C.
- Accession: 1983.1.18
- Website: Museum page

Little Girl in a Blue Armchair (French: Petite fille dans un fauteuil bleu) is an 1878 oil painting by the American painter, printmaker, pastelist, and connoisseur Mary Cassatt. It is in the collection of the National Gallery of Art, Washington D.C. Edgar Degas made some changes in the painting.

== Painting ==
The museum's provenance information suggests the painting was possibly shown at the Fourth Impressionist Exhibition 1879 as Portrait de petite fille.

By 1877 Cassatt had come into frank conflict with the official French art establishment and had had both her submissions for that year rejected by the Salon. So when Edgar Degas invited her to join the Impressionists the same year, a group similarly disaffected by the Salon system, she accepted with eagerness. A planned 1878 exhibition did not take place, because of what Degas judged would be competition from the World's Fair held in Paris that year, but she did hold what amounted to a show of her own at the Spring 1879 Impressionist exhibition, exhibiting a dozen oils and pastels. Exactly which works these all were is not now known with certainty, but it is likely that Little Girl in a Blue Armchair was amongst them.

Cassatt submitted the painting to the Art Gallery of the American pavilion at the 1878 World's Fair, along with another that cannot now be identified. To her intense annoyance it was rejected, although the other was accepted. She expressed her irritation in a 1903 letter to the Parisian art dealer Ambroise Vollard, which makes it plain how much Degas had been involved (he also supplied the model, a daughter of friends of his): "It was the portrait of a friend of M. Degas. I had done the child in the armchair and he found it good and advised me on the background and he even worked on it. I sent it to the American section of the big exposition [of 1878], they refused it ... I was furious, all the more so since he had worked on it. At that time this appeared new and the jury consisted of three people of which one was a pharmacist!" Indeed, the painting is often cited as an example of Degas' influence.

Recent cleaning and infra-red photography at the National Gallery of Art has confirmed Degas' contribution.

The painting is described as "it dazzles with its predominant hue of deep turquoise" and has been regarded to be a masterpiece by Karen Rosenberg in review in The New York Times.

The dog pictured lying in the armchair next the little girl's in Little Girl in a Blue Armchair is a Brussels Griffon. Cassatt was probably introduced to this breed while in Antwerp 1873. Degas presented her with a pup he had procured from fellow Impressionist Ludovic-Napoléon Lepic, a dog lover who bred them, and Cassatt went on to keep them the rest of her life. (Note: The pup was probably the one she named Baptiste or "Batty", her constant companion the next decade.) The painting was purchased from the artist by Ambroise Vollard of Paris around 1903 for his gallery, and was later acquired by Hector Brame of Paris. It was sold in 1963 to Mr. and Mrs. Paul Mellon. They lent it to the National Gallery of Art for exhibitions and eventually gifted it in 1983 to NGA.

== Commentaries ==
Griselda Pollock declares the painting one of the most radical images of childhood of the time. Germaine Greer calls it Cassatt's first real stunner: "As an icon of the awfulness of being at once controlled by adults and ignored by them, this bold work could hardly be bettered", a view echoed by Ben Pollitt in his description of the painting as capturing the huffing and puffing tiresomeness that a child feels within the social constraints of an adult world.

John Bullard likens the chairs to bump cars at an amusement park. The portion Degas worked on was probably the oddly-shaped patch of floor between the chairs, as well as the play of light through the windows. The entire painting shows Degas' influence in the asymmetrical composition, the use of pattern, and the cropping of the image in the manner of the Japanese prints he had introduced Cassatt to. He finds the picture an image of the contented boredom of a comfortable bourgeois life, although the slightly languid and provocative pose of the child is disconcerting.

Judith Barter discounts the idea that the jury at the American Pavilion were affronted by the physicality of the girl's pose. A rather similar painting, in terms of the pose, by the Belgian painter Alfred Cluysenaar had been accepted by the Belgian Pavilion. Where they differed was in their treatment, Cluysenaar's being conventional whereas Cassatt's was radical in her handling of the background, and more nuanced in its psychologism. In Clusysenaar's portrait his son holds the viewer in a direct uncomplicated gaze, whereas Cassatt's little girl's gaze is a more elusive sideways glance that asserts her own independence. Cassatt's compelling motivation in her images of children was their care, reflecting the most advanced ideas of the time concerning maternity and the raising of children. The pastel Mother and Child, for example, continues her Degas-like preoccupation with pattern but primarily addresses the strong emotional bond between mother and child.

The painting is referenced in Harriett Chessman's influential 1993 essay Mary Cassatt and the Maternal Body. Extending Griselda Pollock's notion of the "spaces of femininity", Chessman suggests that Cassatt used the child's body in her mother and child paintings as a way of encoding female sexuality. Judith Barter observes that in Cassatt's social milieu the only proper expression of a woman's sexuality was her maternity. In a painting such as Breakfast in Bed we are aware that we have interrupted an intimate moment, but we have not done so improperly. Chessman describes Breakfast in Bed as an allegory of the maternal body.

=== Illustrations ===
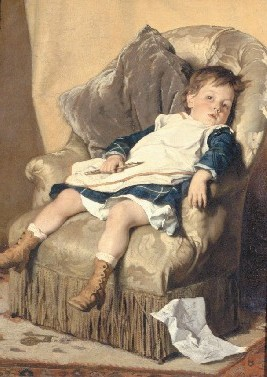
Alfred Cluysenaar, Portrait of the Artist's Son André, 1878, oil on canvas, 111 × 81.5 cm, Royal Museums of Fine Arts of Belgium 2647.

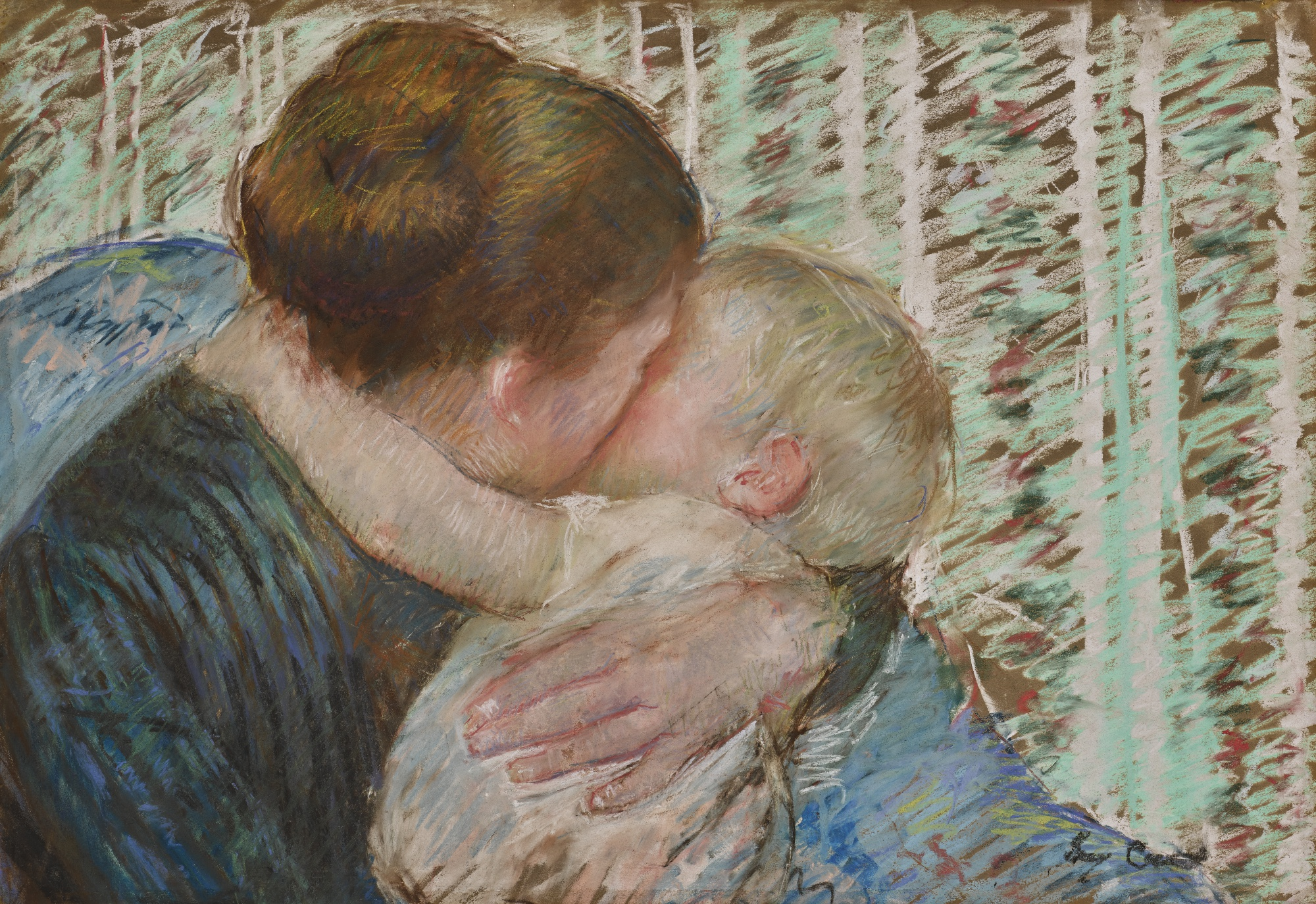
Mary Cassatt, Mother and Child (The Goodnight Hug), 1880, pastel on paper, 42 × 61 cm, private collection.

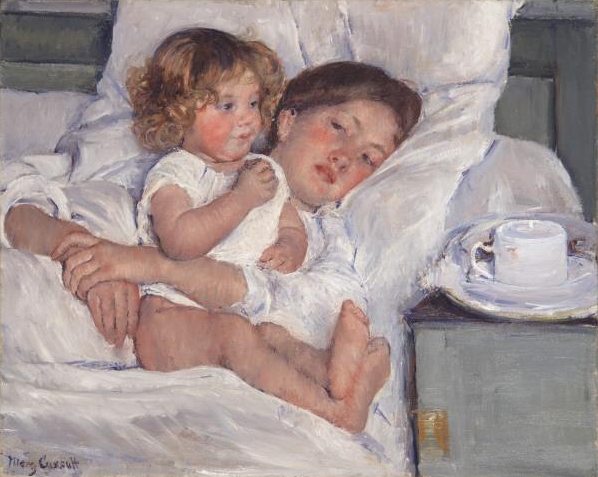
Mary Cassatt, Breakfast in Bed, c. 1897, oil on canvas, 65 × 73.6 cm, Huntington Library.

== See also ==
- List of works by Mary Cassatt

== Bibliography ==
- Barter, Judith A.., ed. (1998). Mary Cassatt, modern woman / organized by Judith A. Barter; with contributions by Erica E. Hirshler ... [et al.]. New York: Harry N. Abrams, Inc. ISBN 0810940892. LCCN 98007306.
- Breeskin, Adelyn D., ed. (1970). Mary Cassatt: 1844 - 1926. Washington: National Gallery of Art. LCCN 71-133323.
- Bullard, John E. (1972). Mary Cassatt: Oils and Pastels. Watson-Guptill Publications. ISBN 0-8230-0569-0. LCCN 70-190524.
- Chessman, Harriet (1993). "Mary Cassatt and the Maternal Body". In Miller, David C. (ed.). American Iconology. London: New Haven. pp. 239–58. ISBN 0300054785. LCCN 92046082.
- Duranty, Louis Edmund (1990) [1876]. La Nouvelle peinture : À propos du groupe d'artistes qui expose dans les galeries Durand-Ruel, 1876 (in French). Paris: Echoppe. ISBN 978-2905657374. LCCN 21010788.
- Greer, Germaine (4 January 2006). "Storm in the teacups". The Guardian. Archived from the original on 3 December 2013.
- Mathews, Nancy Mowll (1994). Mary Cassatt: A Life. New York: Villard Books. ISBN 978-0-394-58497-3. LCCN 98-8028.
- Pollock, Griselda (1998). Mary Cassatt: Painter of Modern Women. London: Thames and Hudson. ISBN 978-0-500-20317-0. LCCN 98-60039.
- Pollock, Griselda (2003) [1988]. "Modernity and the spaces of femininity" (PDF). Vision and Difference: Feminism, Femininity and Histories of Art. London: Routledge. ISBN 978-0415308502. LCCN 87030783.
- Rubinstein, Charlotte Streifer (1982). American Women Artists: From the Early Indian Times to Present. Boston: G. K. Hall. ISBN 0816185352. LCCN 81020135.
- Shackelford, George T.M. (1998). "Pas de Deux: Mary Cassatt and Edgar Degas". In Barter, Judith A.. (ed.). Mary Cassatt, modern woman / organized by Judith A. Barter; with contributions by Erica E. Hirshler ... [et al.] New York: Harry N. Abrams, Inc. pp. 109–43. ISBN 0810940892. LCCN 98007306.
