= Lady at the Tea Table =

Painting by Mary Cassatt

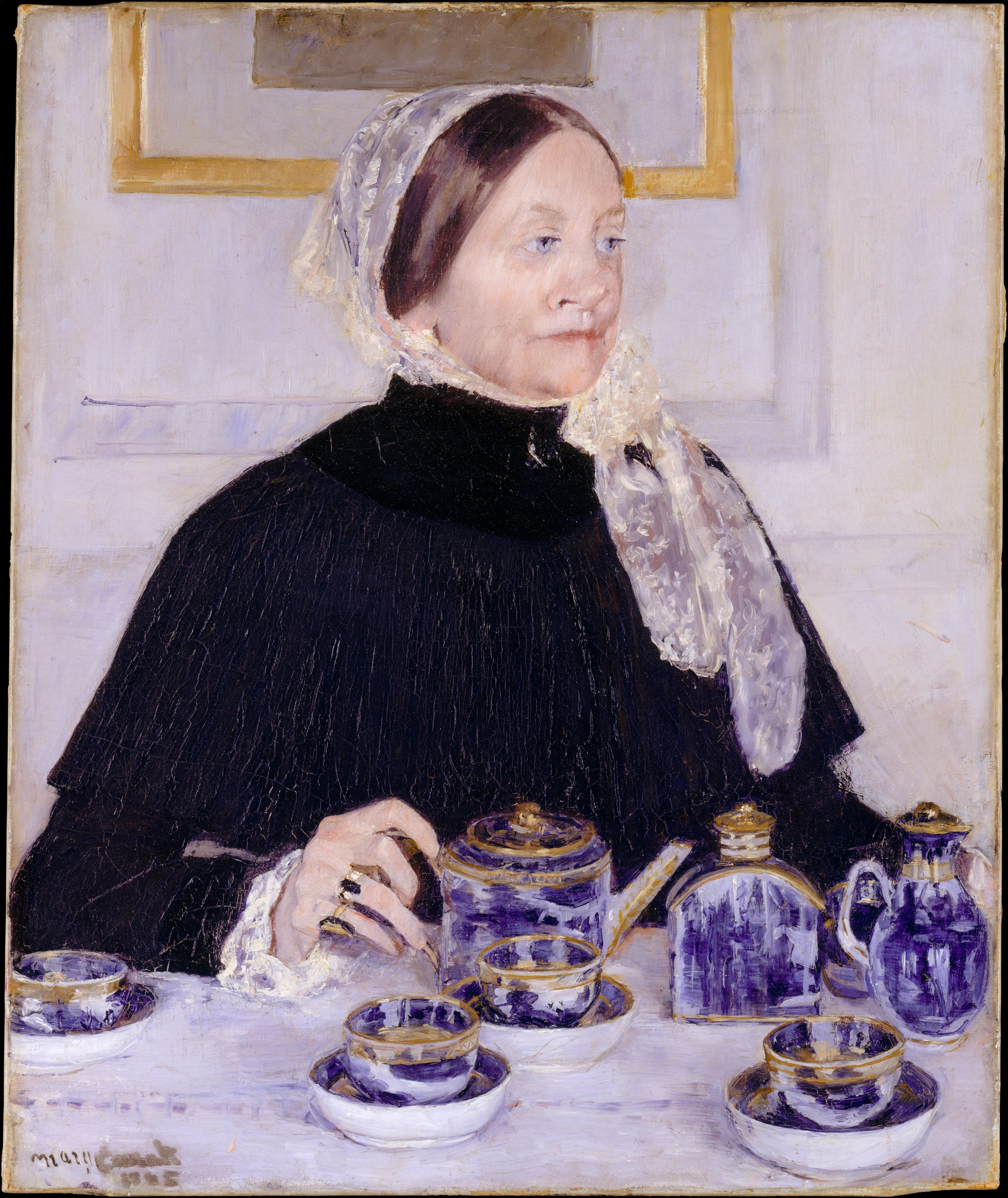
- Artist: Mary Cassatt
- Year: 1883–85
- Medium: Oil on canvas
- Subject: Mary Dickinson Riddle
- Dimensions: 73.7 cm × 61 cm (29.0 in × 24 in)
- Location: Metropolitan Museum of Art; New York

Lady at the Tea Table is a late 19th-century painting by American artist Mary Cassatt. The work, done in oil on canvas, is in the collection of the Metropolitan Museum of Art.

== Description ==
=== History ===
The painting depicts Mary Dickinson Riddle, Cassatt's mother's first cousin, seated at a table set with a tea service. The tea set was a gift to Cassatt's family from Riddle's daughter. The tea service is gilded blue-and-white porcelain from Canton (modern day Guangzhou) in Qing dynasty China; in the 19th century, Canton was renowned for its exports to the Western world, as the port city was one of the centers of the Old China Trade. Lady itself was painted by Cassatt as a gift for the Riddle family. However, Riddle's daughter disliked the painting, thinking it portrayed her mother's nose as being too big, and thus the painting was donated to the Metropolitan Museum of Art by Cassatt in 1923.

=== Painting ===
The painting exemplifies much of Cassatt's unique impressionist style; much emphasis is placed on the subject's stark outline, and Mrs. Riddle's jewelry pairs with the gold gilt on the tea service. Similarly, the faint blue hues used in the background draw the eye to the deeper blues of Riddle's eyes and the porcelain. The relative simplicity of the painting's design is also comparable to orientalist art, which Cassatt was influenced by.

== See also ==
- List of works by Mary Cassatt
