= Woman with a Sunflower =

Painting by Mary Cassatt

- Artist: Mary Cassatt
- Year: 1905
- Catalogue: Mary Cassatt, Oils and Pastels, 28
- Medium: oil on canvas
- Dimensions: 92.1 cm × 73.7 cm (29 in × 36 1/4 in)
- Location: National Gallery of Art, Washington, DC
- Accession: 1963.10.98

Woman with a Sunflower is a 1905 oil painting by the American artist Mary Cassatt. It has been in the collection of the National Gallery of Art in Washington, DC since 1963.

Woman with a Sunflower was among many paintings by Cassatt which were involved in a 1915 exhibition, which raised money for the suffrage campaign. This exhibition took place at the Knoedler Gallery in New York City, Louisine Havemeyer organised this exhibition. The entry fees and the sale of the pamphlets helped Havemeyer found the Woman Suffrage Campaign Fund.

== Description ==
Cassatt is known for mothers and children being the subject of her paintings, and this theme is portrayed in this painting. Woman with a Sunflower depicts a woman and a girl who are both looking into a small circular mirror, from which they are both looking at the child's reflection. The mother's bright outfit draws attention to the child's nudity, which signifies innocence. The mother and child are connected with each other by their hand gestures and gazes towards the mirror. Two mirrors are shown in the painting, which create an arrangement of images within images, highlighting the main focus of the painting, that being the young girl's developing feminine identity under the help and care of a maternal influence, her mother.

== The sunflower ==
The sunflower depicted in Cassatt's painting is also a symbol of the suffrage movement, it is the Kansas state flower. The Suffragists Elizabeth Cady Stanton and Susan B. Anthony encouraged the use of the Sunflower by wearing sunflower pins when campaigning the right to vote in 1867 in Kansas. Throughout the 20th century the colour yellow was used to symbolise the suffrage movement.

== See also ==
- List of works by Mary Cassatt
