= Lydia Crocheting in the Garden at Marly =

Painting by Mary Cassatt

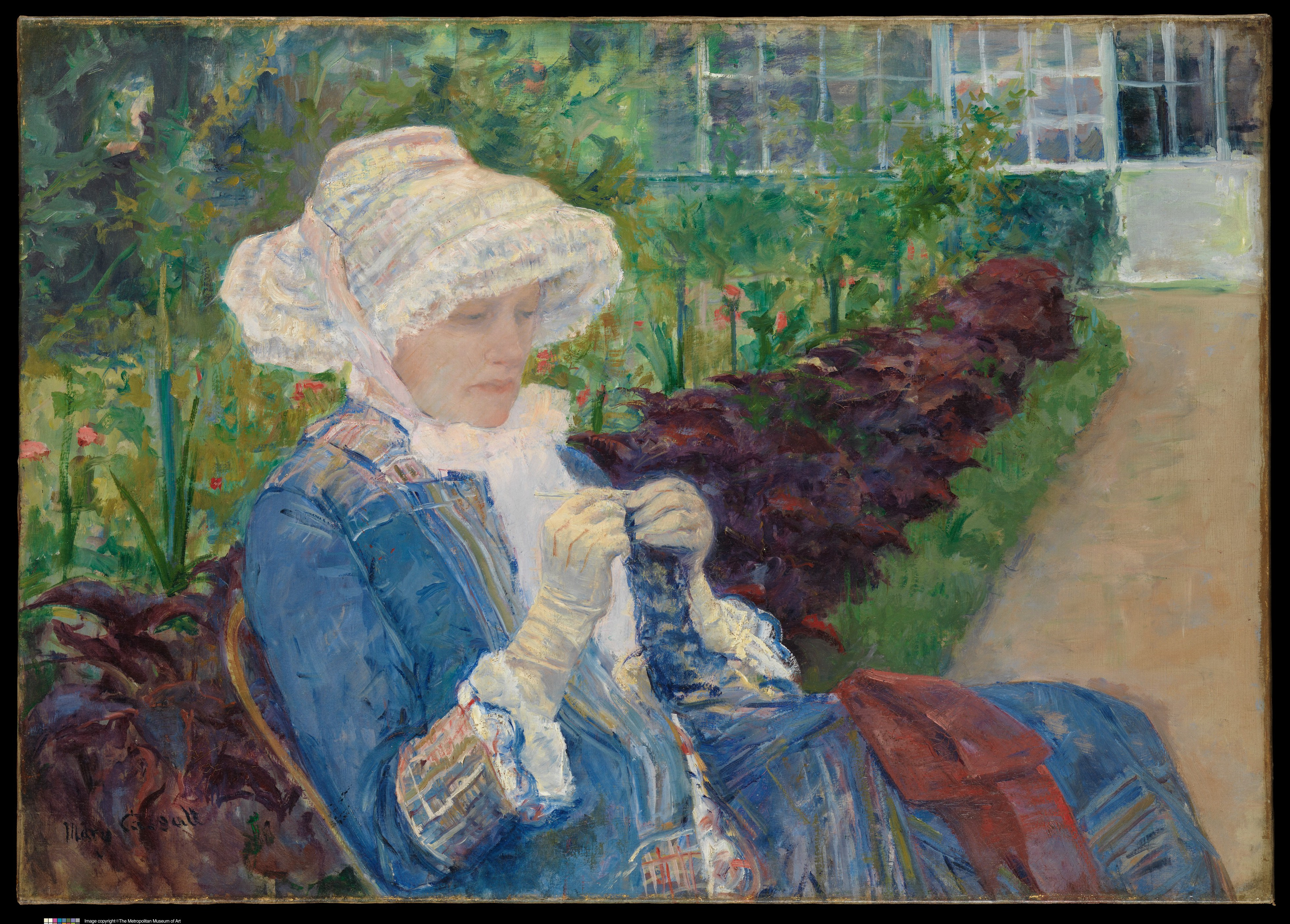
- Artist: Mary Cassatt
- Year: 1880
- Medium: oil on canvas
- Dimensions: 65.6 cm × 92.6 cm (25.8 in × 36.5 in)
- Location: Metropolitan Museum of Art; New York
- Accession: 65.184

Lydia Crocheting in the Garden at Marly is an oil-on-canvas painting by the American artist Mary Cassatt, created in 1880. It is in the collection of the Metropolitan Museum of Art.

== Early history and creation ==
Mary Cassatt's family had come to visit her at Marly-le-Roi in the summer of 1880 where the painter was living with her sister Lydia. Lydia, who suffered from Bright's disease, had moved from Philadelphia to live with Cassatt, who had relocated to Paris. At the time, unmarried women did not live alone, and as Lydia's disease progressed, she was no longer able to travel. The remainder of the family joined the sisters in the summer of 1880 and Cassatt's work at that time shifted to images depicting home life. Lydia became a frequent subject of Cassatt's work until her death in 1882. Although Cassatt usually avoided plein air painting, the vivid representation of sunlight in this work suggests that it was painted in the garden.

== Later history and display ==
The painting was first shown in 1881 at the Sixth Impressionist Exhibition in Paris with eleven other works by Cassatt. In 1893, the painting was listed in the inventory of the art dealer Paul Durand-Ruel. By the following year, Peter Arrell Browne Widener, a Philadelphia collector, had obtained the work. Later, Cassatt's brother Alexander Cassatt reacquired the painting and it remained in the family until Mrs. Gardner Cassatt donated it to the Metropolitan Museum of Art in 1965.

== Description and interpretation ==
Immediately following the American Civil War, paintings of women in elegant gardens became popular. Following this tradition, the work depicts Lydia in the garden, crocheting, though the painting distinctly sets Lydia apart from the blossoms. Painted in an Impressionist style, the greenhouse and orderly rows of plants are behind Lydia, who is shown as occupied and seemingly unaware of the garden at her back. Her pale complexion is offset by the tartan and lace-cuffed garment she wears. Lydia appears to be enjoying her time in the sunshine beneath her lace bonnet. Lydia Crocheting in the Garden at Marly, along with Lydia Seated in the Garden with a Dog in Her Lap and Katherine Cassatt Reading to Her Grandchildren remain some of her finest pictures from this period of her career.

== See also ==
- List of works by Mary Cassatt
