= Lilacs in a Window =

Painting by Mary Cassatt

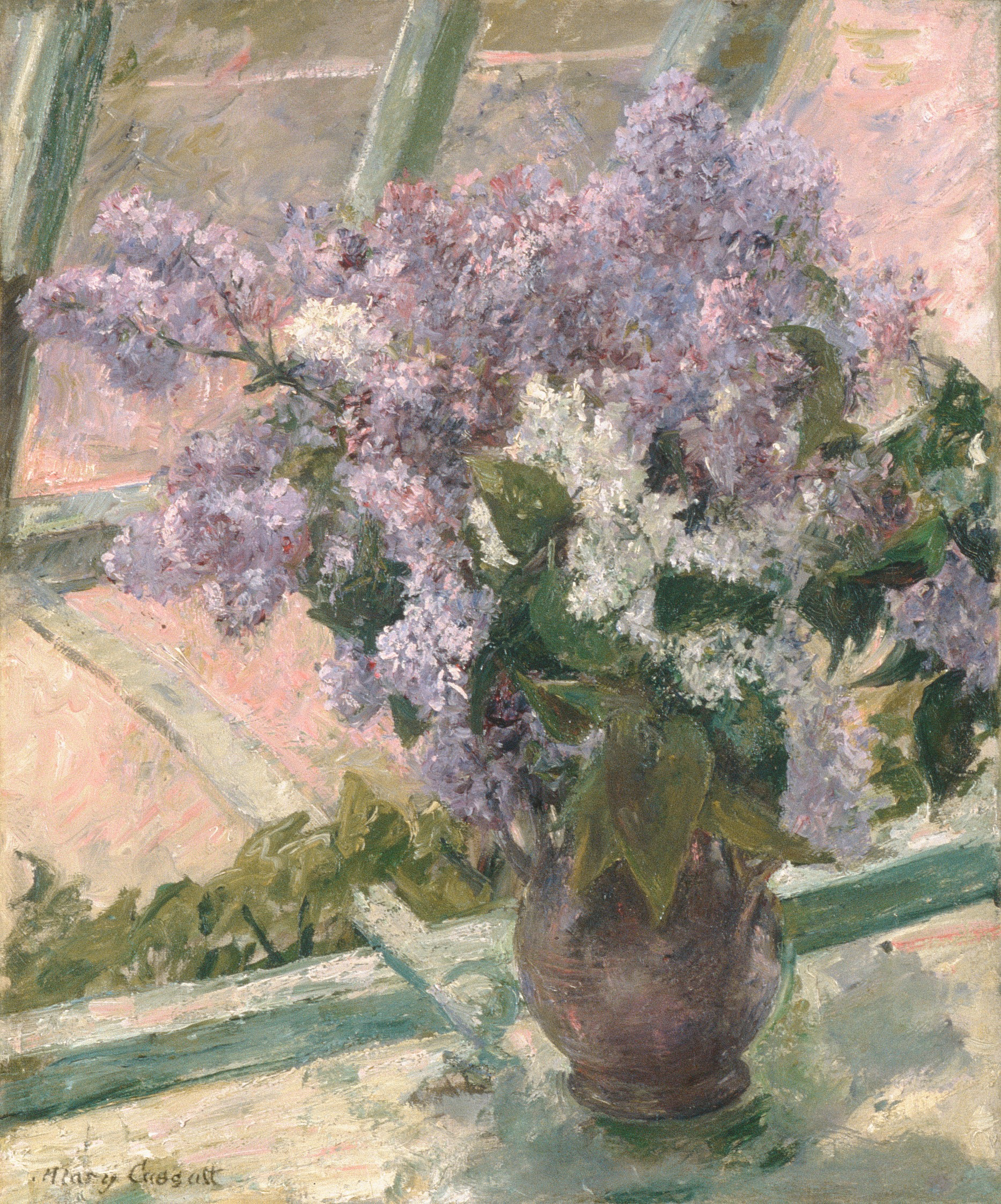
- Artist: Mary Cassatt
- Year: 1879
- Catalogue: BrCR 164
- Medium: Oil on canvas
- Dimensions: 61.6 cm × 50.8 cm (24.3 in × 20 in)
- Location: Metropolitan Museum of Art; New York
- Accession: 1997.207
- Website: Museum page

Lilacs in a Window is a painting by the American painter, printmaker, pastelist, and connoisseur Mary Cassatt which is in the collection of the Metropolitan Museum of Art in New York.

It is one of the few still-lifes she executed and was originally owned by the Parisian art collector Moyse Dreyfus. Cassatt had been introduced to him by her Impressionist friends, and he became a friend and early patron. Cassatt included a portrait of him, Mr. Moyse Dreyfus, in her show at the Fourth Impressionist Exhibition of 1879.

It is on view in the Metropolitan Museum's Gallery 774.

== See also ==
- List of works by Mary Cassatt

== Bibliography ==
- Mathews, Nancy Mowll (1994). Mary Cassatt: A Life. New York: Villard Books. ISBN 978-0-394-58497-3. LCCN 98-8028.
