= The Child's Bath =

Painting by Mary Cassatt

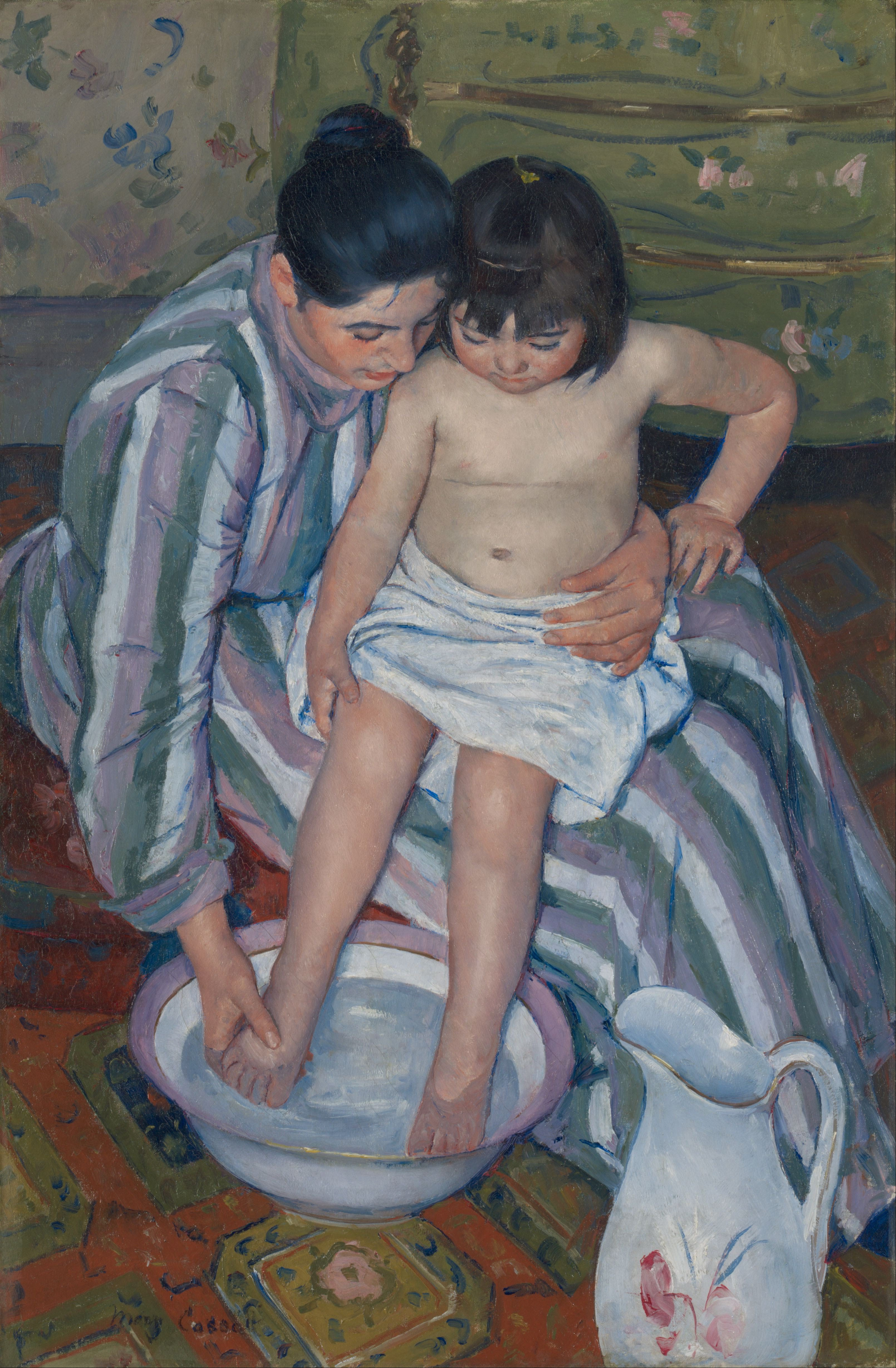
- Artist: Mary Cassatt
- Year: 1893
- Medium: Oil on canvas
- Dimensions: 100.3 cm × 66.1 cm (39.5 in × 26 in)
- Location: Art Institute of Chicago; Chicago

The Child's Bath (or The Bath) is an 1893 oil painting by American artist Mary Cassatt. The painting continues her interest in depicting bathing and motherhood, but it is distinct in its angle of vision. Both the subject matter and the overhead perspective were inspired by Japanese Woodcut prints and Edgar Degas.

It was bought by the Art Institute of Chicago in 1910, and has since become one of the most popular pieces in the museum.

== Subject matter ==
=== Bathing ===
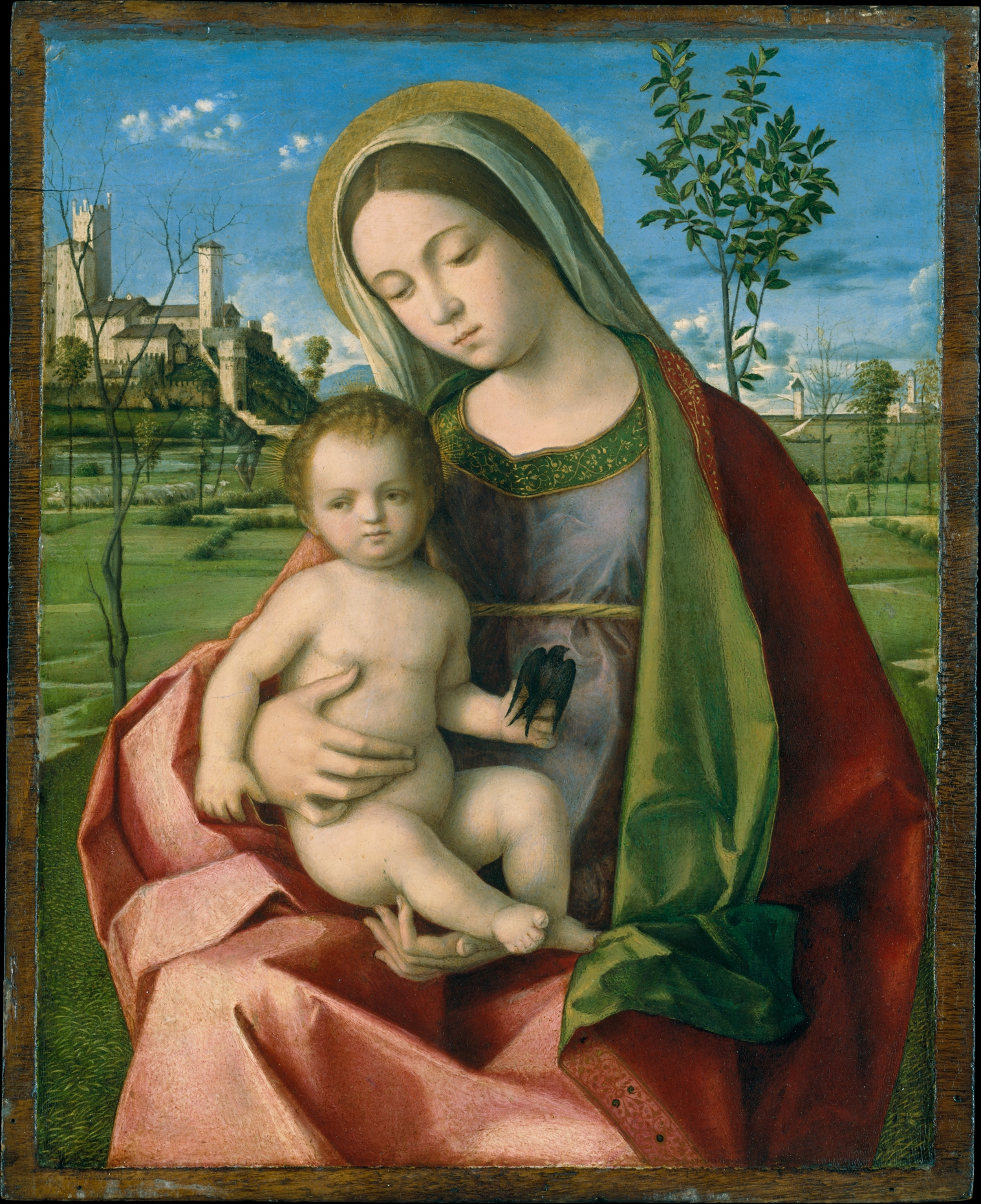
Workshop of Giovanni Bellini, Madonna and Child, 1510, oil on wood, 34.3 x 27.6 cm, Metropolitan Museum of Art, New York City

In the mid-1880s, there were several cholera outbreaks in France, and public health campaigns called on people to bathe regularly. Bathing was coming to be understood as a medical prevention measure against diseases. At the same time, mothers were encouraged to take care of their own children, rather than utilizing caretakers, using modern hygiene methods employed at the time.

=== Mother-child relationship ===
Cassatt's interest in portraying the mother-child relationship first became clear when she started specializing in drypoints and pastels after 1887, and she intended to bring out the "psychological, sociological, and spiritual meaning" from everyday routines and subjects. Although Cassatt's reason for specializing in such a theme was never clearly explained by the artist herself, scholars have speculated that it was led by both "pragmatic and idealistic impulses".

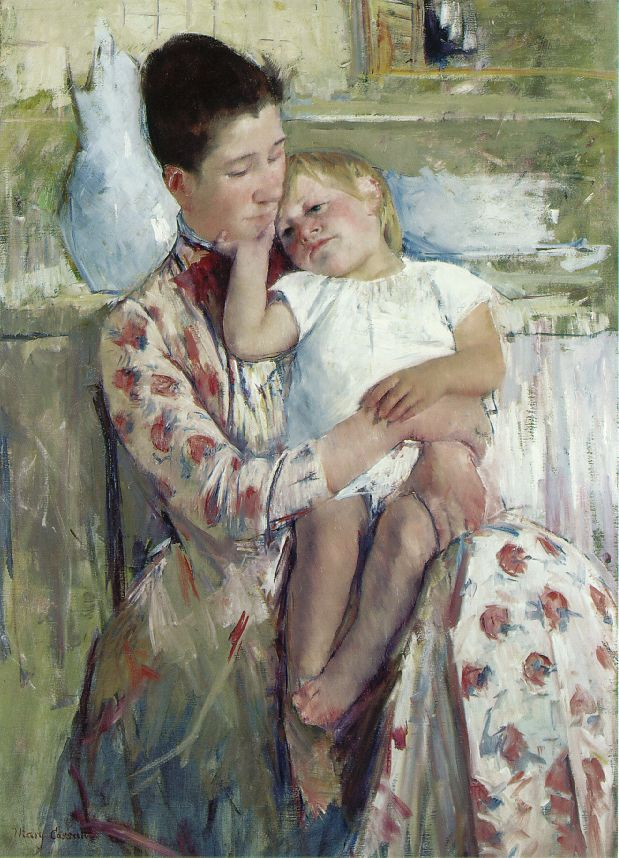
Mary Cassatt, Mother and Child, 1890, oil on canvas 64.26 x 89.66 cm, private collection

The mother-child relationship was a common theme among French artists in 1890 and popularized through several influential artists at the time. In addition, Cassatt's interest may be connected with the work of Correggio and other Italian and Spanish masters, especially their traditional portrayals of Madonna and Christ Child. As an Impressionist, she hoped to discover new techniques and approaches to the theme by bringing it into the contemporary context.

Cassatt's depiction of mother and child relations in the 1890s revolutionized traditional religious subjects by casting them in a "secular and naturalistic" context. By doing so, she mediated the conflicts between tradition and novelty. Because her initial series of mothers and children resemble the clarity and simplicity of that in Renaissance art, she was called "la sainte famille modern" by her dealers such as Paul Durand-Ruel.

In the depiction of mothers, Cassatt consciously avoided using the female nude, which she considered as an appeal to men's treatment of women as erotic objects. Rather, she wished to emphasize the "moral sensibility and totality" of women's lives and only to suggest their sexuality through maternal relationships. The act of touching between the mother and the child in her works serves to indicate emotional and physical gratification as well as a feeling of protection and intimacy. On the other hand, Cassatt limits herself to include the nude body of children, but such nudity carries no sexual implication; instead, it is "natural and sensual" and symbolizes "goodness, purity, and lack of artifice". Combining the fully clothed mother with a partially dressed child, she rejected any sexual feelings; she moves the sensuality to a proper condition, the motherhood in which physical intimacy is allowed and appropriate.

== Description ==
The genre painting depicts a mother bathing a young child: an everyday scene that is "special by not being special". It is signed to the lower left "Mary Cassatt".

The woman is sitting on an oriental carpet, with the child on her knees. The child has a white cloth swathed around their abdomen, and the woman is wearing a dress with strong vertical stripes of green, pink and white. The woman holds the infant firmly and protectively around its waist with her left hand while the other hand carefully washes the child's bare limbs in a basin of water, resting on the floor beside a jug decorated with a floral pattern. The chubby left arm of the child braces against the mother's leg, while their other hand grips the child's own right thigh. The mother's right hand presses firmly but still gently on the child's right foot in the basin, mimicking the child's own pressure on her thigh. In the background are floral patterns of painted furniture and wallpaper.

To indicate depth, Cassatt painted the faces receding into space. The paint strokes are layered and rough, creating thick lines that outline the figures and make them stand out from the patterned background. The hand of the artist is evident through the roughness of the strokes.

== Stylistic analysis ==
=== Patterns and colors ===
Many scholars have noted that The Child’s Bath recaptures the qualities present in her previous work by utilizing similar techniques. The composition is divided into two parts: the patterned area in the background and the pink and white area of the figure. Cassatt employed rich patterns, such as the floral wallpaper and the striped dress of the mother, to create a contrast with the plain torso of the child, making the child more prominent.

=== Angle of vision ===
The most distinctive feature of the painting is the angle of vision, which creates the sense of hovering above the scene. This perspective draws the viewer's attention to the two figures while giving a complete view of the surrounding space, but it serves more than a decorative purpose. Due to this tilted angle of vision, the obscured facial expressions of the mother and the child create a psychological distance, but their gazes at the reflections of the water guide the audience to concentrate on the activity of bathing.

=== Composition ===
Cassatt also created a cohesive composition through the gestures of the figures and geometrical resonances. The stripes of the mother's dress echo her straight arms, coinciding with the child's linear limbs. The oval shapes of the figures’ heads resemble that of the basin below; the shapes are connected by the diagonals created by the figures. Interlocking gestures also unify the scene: the contacts of hands on the knee, and the touching of the feet in the basin tie the painting together while conveying the underlying themes of intimacy and tenderness.

Overall, art historian Griselda Pollock suggests that unlike Cassatt's previous works, in which these formal devices were used to convey “unexpected symbolic meaning” within an ordinary action, The Child’s Bath underscores the actions of the mother and child rather than their relationship in particular. However, Nancy Mowll Mathews suggests that the two figures appear to be serious and solemn, rather than playful and fully relaxed; this formality of the scene makes the mother and her child seem to be “engaging in a sacred site” and resembles “Madonna washing the feet of the Christ Child”.

== Influences ==
Both the subject matter and the unusual perspective of the painting, viewing the foreshortened subjects from above, were inspired by Japanese prints and Degas. "Japanese printmakers were more interested in decorative impact than precise perspective."

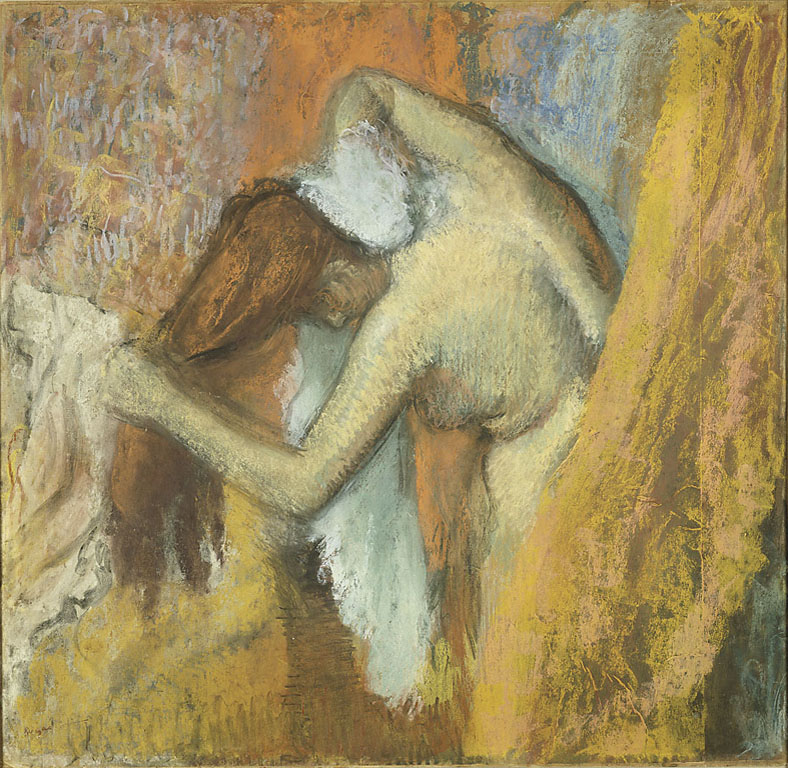
Edgar Degas, Woman at Her Toilette, 1900-1905, pastel on tracing paper, 75 × 72 cm, The Art Institute of Chicago

=== Comparison with Edgar Degas ===
Cassatt was heavily influenced by some of her Impressionist peers, especially Edgar Degas. The first Impressionist painting to travel to the United States was a pastel by Degas in 1875 that she purchased. Cassatt began to exhibit with the Impressionists in 1877, where she met other fellow Impressionists such as Claude Monet and Berthe Morisot.

The devices Cassatt deployed in The Child’s Bath were influenced by Degas: particularly, the subject of bathing and the acute angle of vision. However, Cassatt's manipulation carries a different focus and evokes more heightened emotions. Both artists often depicted their bathers with "a lack of self-consciousness”, but Degas tended to isolate nude female figures in order to bring forth the intimacy through their movements. These figures’ ignorance of being observed in their private moments has been interpreted as demonstrating Degas’ voyeuristic perspective as a man gaining sexual pleasures from the act of peeking. In contrast, the nude children in Cassatt's works are accompanied by an adult caring for their children. Degas utilized the hovering angle of vision to suggest “the effect of peering,” while Cassatt's utilization of such technique with a contrast of the solidity of the figures draws the audience's attention mainly to the actions of the mother and child; by doing so, Cassatt was able to achieve emotional monumentality.

=== Comparison with Japanese woodcuts ===
Cassatt was struck by the Japanese ukiyo-e woodcut prints exhibited at the Beaux-Arts Academy in Paris in 1890, three years before painting The Child's Bath. Cassatt was drawn to the simplicity and clarity of the Japanese art, and the skillful use of blocks of color, such as the c.1801 print "Woman Washing a Baby in a Tub" or "Bathtime" (行水, Gyōzui) by Kitagawa Utamaro. Not only did Utamaro's techniques speak to Cassatt, his depiction of the mother and child relationship, conveying intimacy and sympathy, also inspired her. She worked on a series of prints inspired by the Japanese works in the next few years, with cropped subjects, a flattened perspective and decorative patterns. This 1893 painting can be viewed as a culmination of that work. Like her previous works, the composition of The Child’s Bath resembles the shape of Japanese prints by utilizing an “extended vertical format” along with the long straight limbs of the figures. Additionally, the seeing-from-above perspective which was used widely in Japanese art is also prominent in Cassatt's painting.

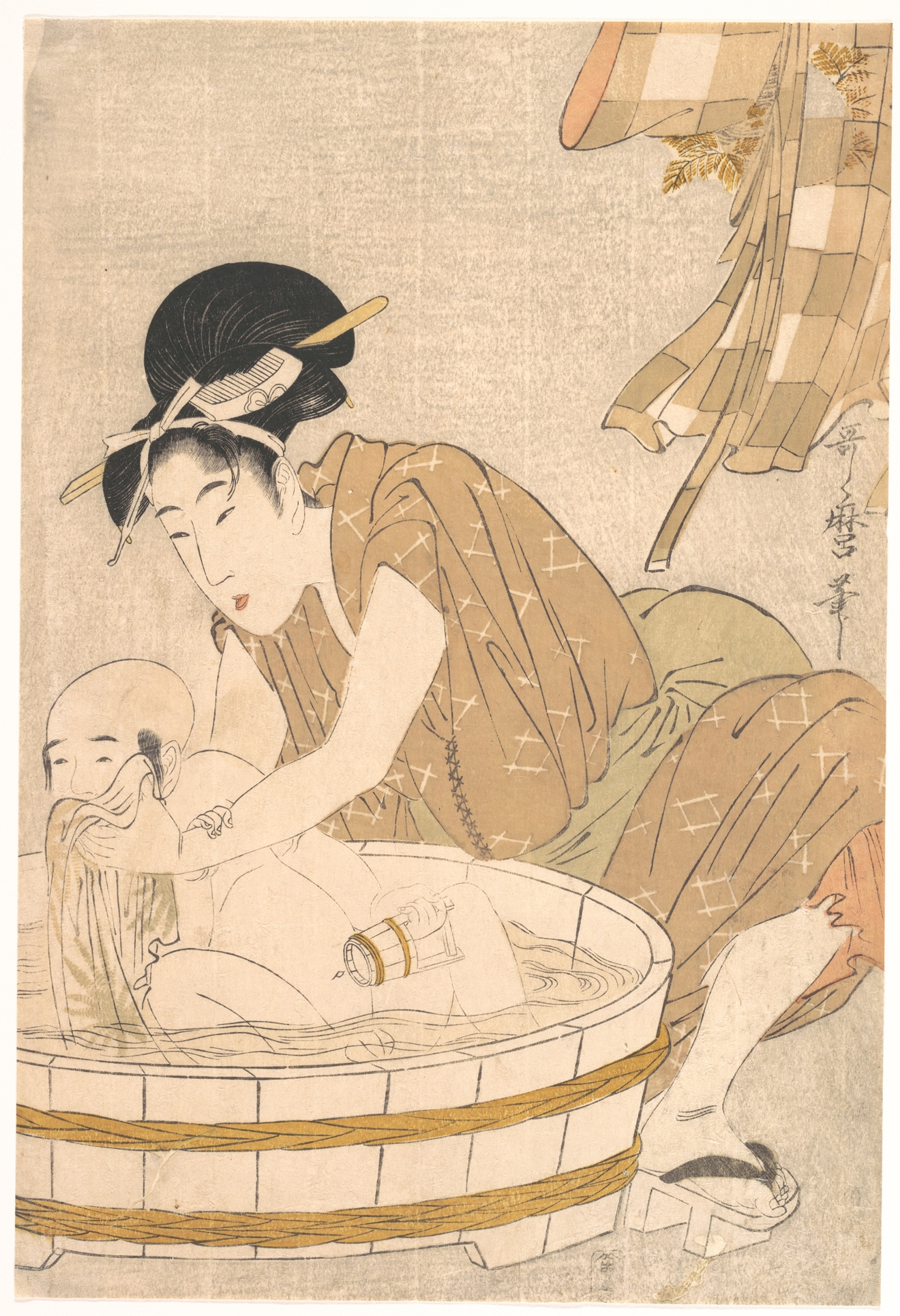
Kitagawa Utamaro's woodcut print Bathtime (行水, Gyōzui), c.1801, 37.3 cm × 25.1 cm (14.7 in × 9.9 in), Metropolitan Museum of Art

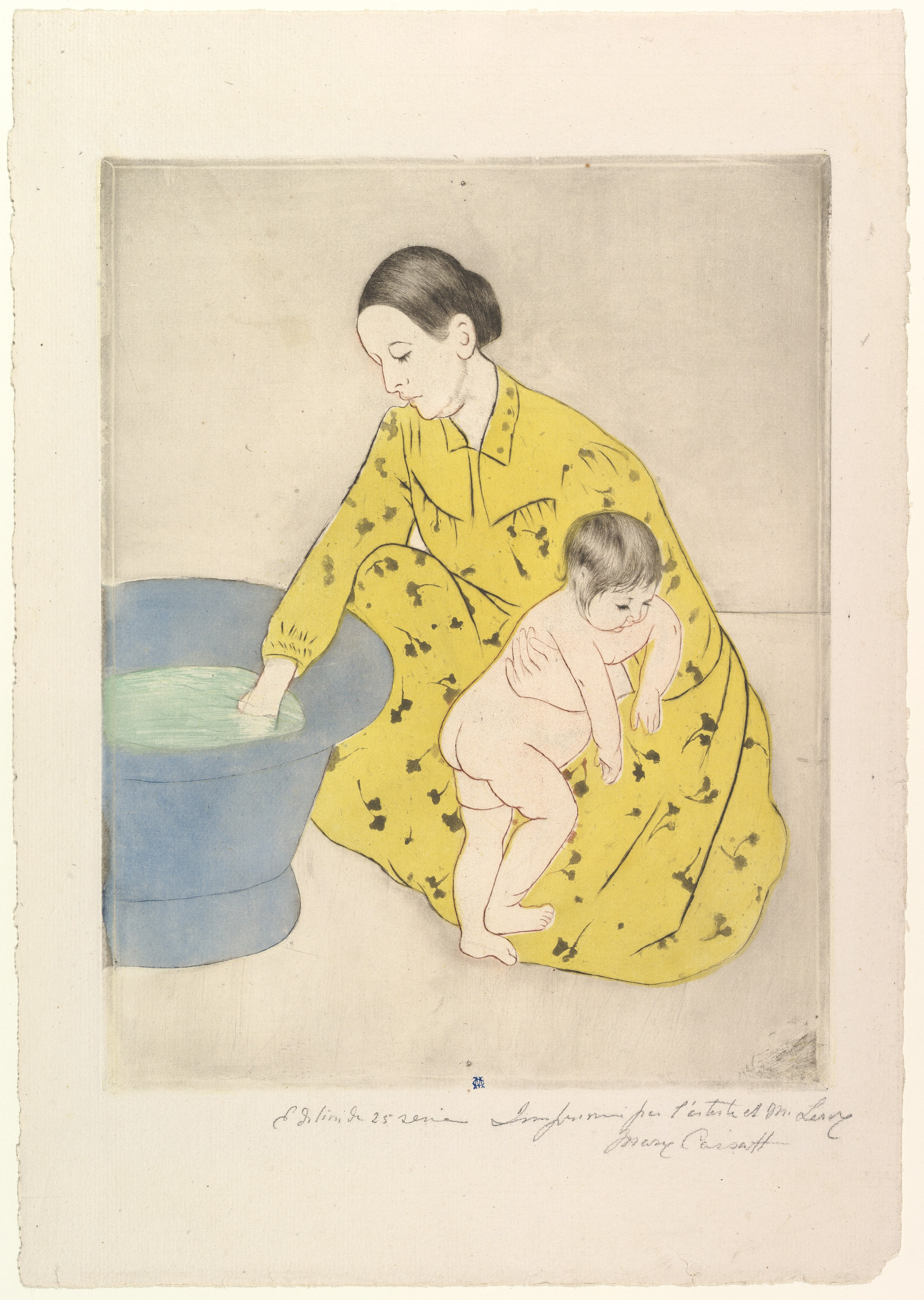
Mary Cassatt's 1890-91 drypoint etching and aquatint The Bath, 43.2 cm × 30 cm (17.0 in × 11.8 in), Metropolitan Museum of Art

== Provenance ==
During the late 1880s to 1890s, France favored domestic artists, and this made Cassatt feel excluded, prompting her to turn her attention back to her native country, the United States. Even though she was initially met with ambivalence from critics, the assistance of Paul Durand-Ruel was able to assure her success and status as an American artist.

The artist sold the painting to Durand-Ruel and it was exhibited at the Durand-Ruel gallery in Paris in late 1893 under the title La Toilette de l'Enfant. It was sold to Connecticut industrialist and art collector Harris Whittemore in 1894, but lent back to Durand-Ruel for an exhibition at their New York gallery in 1895 under the title La Toilette. In order to help Cassatt achieve her goals in the U.S., Durand-Ruel explored new ways to expand Cassatt's American audience: through museums and institution exhibitions. When the artist returned home in 1897, Durand-Ruel first submitted The Child’s Bath and Reverie (Also known as Woman with a Red Zinnia) to the annual exhibition at Pennsylvania Academy of the Fine Arts in early 1898. Afterward, Durand-Ruel helped to circulate Cassatt's The Child’s Bath along with her other works in multiple major cities in the U.S. from 1897 to the early 1900s, and this successfully established Cassatt as an American artist.

The painting was sold to the Art Institute of Chicago in 1910.

== See also ==
- List of works by Mary Cassatt
- 100 Great Paintings, 1980 BBC series

== Sources ==
- Janes, Karen Hosack. "Great Paintings". New York: Dorling Kindersley Limited, 2011. ISBN 978-0-7566-8675-8. 179–180.
- The Bath, The Art Institute of Chicago
- The Child's Bath, Mary Cassatt, 1893, Google Arts & Culture
- The Bath 1890–91, Mary Cassatt, Metropolitan Museum of Art
- The Bath 1890–91, Mary Cassatt, Google Arts & Culture
- Bathtime (Gyōzui) ca. 1801, Kitagawa Utamaro, Metropolitan Museum of Art
- Barter, Judith A., Mary Cassatt, and Erica E. Hirshler. Mary Cassatt, Modern Woman. New York, NY: Art Institute of Chicago, 1998. ISBN 0810940892. pp. 66, 74–77, 145–146, 156, 159.
- Bullard, E. John. Mary Cassatt: Oils and Pastels. New York, NY: Watson-Guptill., 1972. ISBN 0823005690. pp. 53.
- Ives, Colta Feller. Great Wave: The Influence of Japanese Woodcuts on French Prints. New York, NY: Metropolitan Museum of Art, 1974. ISBN 0870990985. pp. 46.
- Pollock, Griselda. Mary Cassatt. London: Chaucer Press, 2005. ISBN 190444931X. pp. 110.
- Potter, Polyxeni. “Women Caring for Children in 'The Floating World.’” Emerging Infectious Diseases 12, no. 11 (2006).
- Mathews, Nancy Mowll. Mary Cassatt. New York, NY: Abrams in association with National Museum of American Art, Smithsonian Institution, 1987. ISBN 0810907933. pp. 72–73, 76, 97.
- Woman at Her Toilette, Edgar Degas, 1900–1905, Wikimedia Commons.
- Madonna and Child, Workshop of Giovanni Bellini, 1510, Wikimedia Commons.
- Mother and Child, Mary Cassatt, 1890, Wikimedia Commons.
