= The Boating Party =

Painting by Mary Cassatt

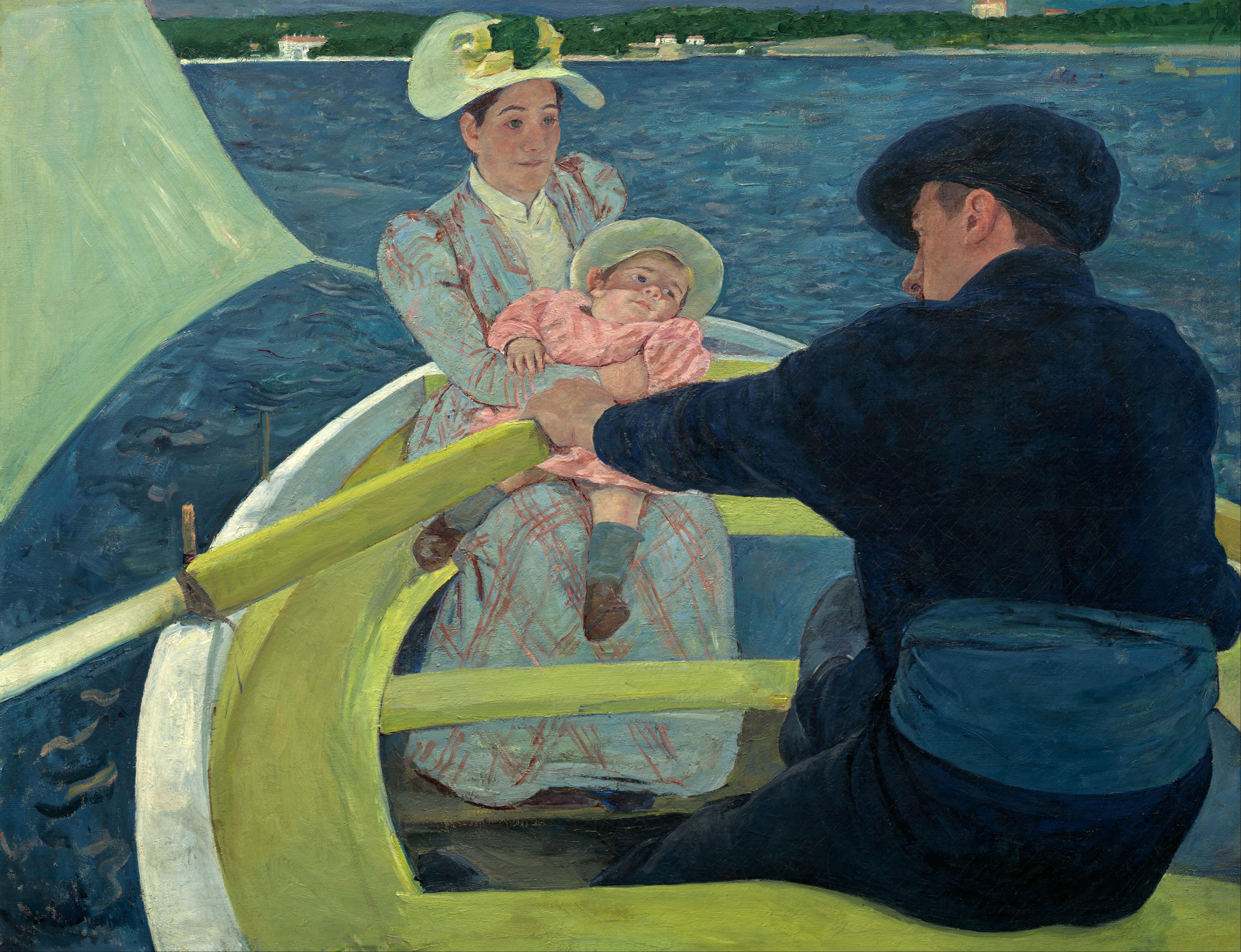
- Artist: Mary Cassatt
- Year: 1893
- Completion date: 1894
- Medium: oil on canvas
- Movement: Post Impressionism
- Dimensions: 90 cm × 117.3 cm (46 3/16 in × 35 7/16 in)
- Location: National Gallery of Art, Washington, DC
- Accession: 1963.10.94
- Website: www.nga.gov/artworks/46569-boating-party

The Boating Party is an oil painting by American artist Mary Cassatt created in 1893. It is also known under the titles La partie en bateau; La barque; Les canotiers; and En canot. Measuring nearly three by four feet, it is one of Cassatt’s largest and most ambitious paintings. It has been in the Chester Dale Collection of the National Gallery of Art since 1963.

== Background ==
Cassatt painted The Boating Party during the winter of 1893–1894 in Antibes, on the French Riviera. Cassatt spent January and February 1894 at the Villa "La Cigaronne," in Cap d'Antibes with her mother. The previous year had been a successful one: Cassatt had completed the mural Modern Woman for the Woman's Building at Chicago's 1893 World's Columbian Exposition, her exhibition in 1893 at Durand-Ruel's gallery had been well received, and the French state had decided to purchase one of her paintings for the Musée du Luxembourg.

== Description ==
The Boating Party depicts an unknown woman, baby, and man in a sailboat. The boat has a canoe stern, is boomless, and has three thwarts to sit on. Cassatt uses bold, dark colors to depict the boatman and bright yellow to contrast the boat and its passengers. The child is held in the woman’s lap with the man facing them and his back to the audience. Griselda Pollock notes that the man in the painting is dressed in a refined version of the local fisherman’s clothing which is shown through the sash around his waist and the floppy beret atop his head.

It is an unusual painting in Cassatt's œuvre. While it does show her familiar theme of a mother and child, most of her other paintings are set in interiors or in gardens. It is also one of her largest oil paintings, surpassed in size only by a mural she painted in 1893 for the World's Columbian Exposition in Chicago, now lost.

== Influences ==
Cassatt conceived the painting while looking out at the Mediterranean landscape from La Cigaronne, where she noted that “the country is too beautiful, it grows wearisome” and that the people of Antibes were not beautiful enough for her to draw inspiration from. The art historian Adelyn Breeskin notes that Impressionism, Japanese printmaking, and Correggio’s Madonna and Child all shaped the style of The Boating Party. The vibrancy of the woman and child, as well as the boat and sea, are indicative of this Impressionist emphasis on bright colors based on plein air observation. The cropped view of the boat and the asymmetrical composition also suggest the influence of Ukiyo-e prints, which interested Cassatt. In 1890, Cassatt had visited the great Japanese Print exhibition at the École de Beaux-arts in Paris. Mary Cassatt owned Japanese prints by Kitagawa Utamaro (1753–1806). The exhibition at Durand-Ruel of Japanese art proved the most important influence on Cassatt. Cassatt's depiction of the woman and child was also inspired by Antonio da Correggio, who used a soft, natural style to depict his Madonna and Child paintings.

Frederick A. Sweet suggests that Cassatt may have been inspired by Édouard Manet's Boating from 1874.

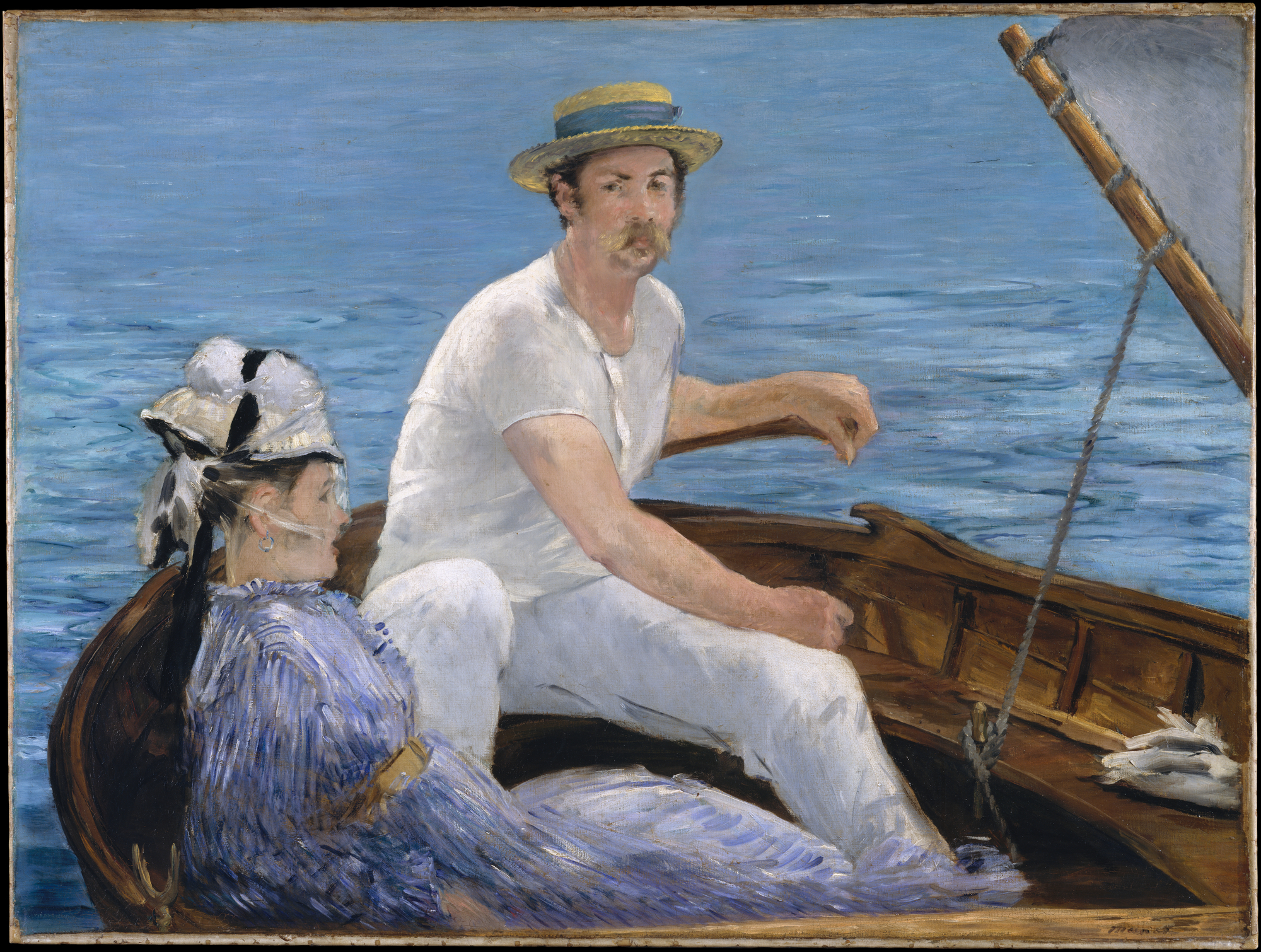
Boating, 1874, Edouard Manet

Boating was exhibited at the Impressionist Exhibition of 1879, where it was not well received. Cassatt however, convinced her friend Louisine Havemeyer to buy it.

== Analysis ==
The Boating Party was one of the rare instances in which Cassatt depicted a man. Though the roles of each figure in the painting are unclear, Griselda Pollock believes that Cassatt is referencing the family dynamic of the late 1800s. Cassatt, according to Pollock, may have been attempting to show that while the man focuses on his work (i.e. rowing), the woman watches over the child. This dynamic is further emphasized by the use of the oar which Pollock claims may be being used to separate the male and female realms. Cassatt, who was known for associating women with nature, creativity, and renewal, may have placed the woman and child as the focal point of the painting because she wanted to show the importance of the mother role in society. Though there is no definitive relationship between the members of the painting, Pollock assumed that the woman is the mother of the child based on Cassatt’s previous works which highlighted the mother-child relationship.

Pollock also states that the relationship between the man, woman, and child is suggested by their hands all meeting in the middle, while only the child and woman make direct contact. This fact, Pollock indicates, was meant to show the physical and psychological distance of the man from the other occupants of the boat.

Several scholars have suggested that Cassatt wished to make the mother and child the focal point of the painting by positioning them at the intersection of the diagonal lines formed by the oar, the sail, and the man's arm. Cassatt also uses these elements to bring the spectator into the painting itself.

Nancy Mathews regards the painting as an exploration of themes from different phases of Cassatt's career. Mathews claims that The Boating Party attempts to bring Cassatt’s past and present into the same work. The boatsman, who is depicted in dark colors in the foreground, represents Cassatt’s earlier artwork; the brightly lit mother and child highlight Cassatt’s current artistic subject.

== Legacy ==
Though the Boating Party was considered one of Cassatt’s largest and best works, Cassatt did not want to sell the painting because it held sentimental value for her. In 1914, Cassatt wrote “About the painting, La Barque, I do not want to sell it; I have already promised it to my family. It was done at Antibes 20 years ago—the year my niece came into the world." However, later in life, she would place the painting on the market for sale as she did not believe her family held the painting in the same esteem as she did.

Art historian Frederick A. Sweet calls The Boating Party "One of the most ambitious paintings [Cassatt] ever attempted." According to Breeskin, no female painter has yet surpassed Mary Cassatt’s work. Cassatt’s unique artistic style in The Boating Party, which combined American and French Impressionism, Japanese woodblock painting styles, and her own innovations, would later become a well-known model from which many future female artists would learn.

In 1966, the painting appeared on a US postage stamp.

== Provenance ==
- 1918 Durand-Ruel, New York
- October 1, 1929 sold to Chester Dale.
- 1963 National Gallery of Art.

colorplate 75 35 7/16x46 1/8 in. (90 x117 cm) The Chester Dale Collection.

== See also ==
- List of works by Mary Cassatt
