= Girl Arranging Her Hair =

Painting by Mary Cassatt

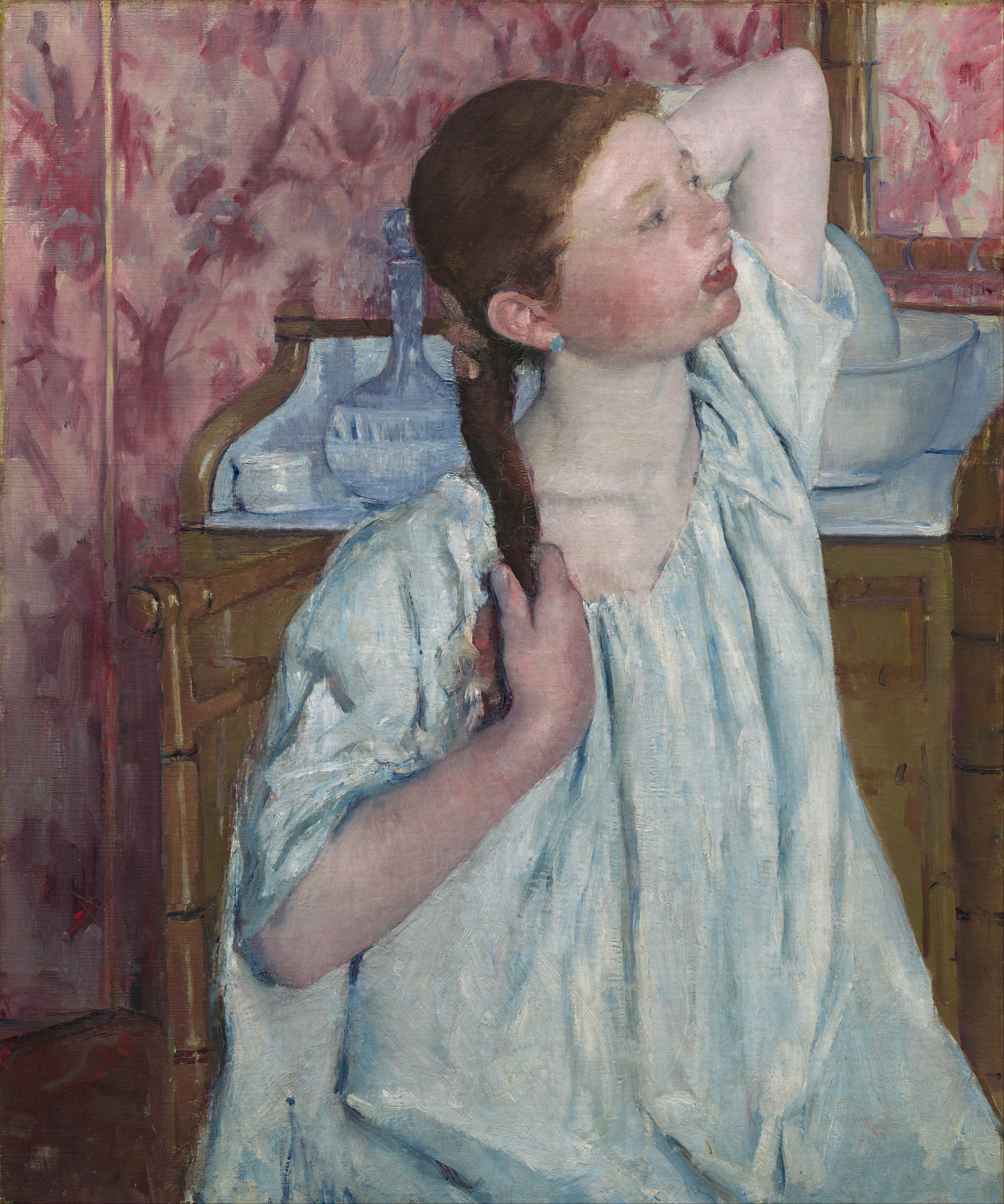
- Artist: Mary Cassatt
- Year: 1886
- Type: Oil on canvas
- Dimensions: 75.1 by 62.5 centimetres (29.6 in × 24.6 in)
- Location: National Gallery of Art; Washington, D.C.

Girl Arranging Her Hair is an 1886 painting by American artist Mary Cassatt. The painting currently is in the collection of the National Gallery of Art, in Washington, D.C. It was originally exhibited at the Eighth and last Impressionist exhibition, which opened on May 15, 1886.

The painting is a departure from Cassatt's usual style in its increased emphasis on drawing and control. Born from a debate with Edgar Degas, who doubted women's artistic abilities, the painting reflects Cassatt's successful attempt to prove him wrong. Degas, captivated by the piece's blend of classical and contemporary styles, acquired it for his collection. The artwork portrays a young girl preparing for bed, challenging norms by acknowledging her awkwardness and self-consciousness. Cassatt deliberately chose an unconventional subject, experimenting with the simultaneous depiction of ugliness and beauty, a technique acquired from Degas. The painting's mastery lies in Cassatt's adept handling of form, composition, color, and light.

== Background ==
Girl Arranging Her Hair was the product of a debate between Cassatt and Edgar Degas, a good friend of hers and fellow Impressionist. Degas remarked that women did not have style in the arts, and Cassatt took Girl Arranging Her Hair as an opportunity to prove him wrong. Cassatt worked tirelessly on the piece, as revealed from a remark from Mr. Cassat on April 14, 1886:

Mame is feeling pretty well and working like a beaver… on a little red-headed girl in demi-costume, dressing her hair before a glass. The two or three experts and artists who have seen it praise it without stint. As for Degas, he was quite enthusiastic, for him.

Cassatt’s attempts at proving her style were successful, as Degas's fascination with the piece led to his acquisition of Girl Arranging Her Hair for his personal collection. Degas was interested in the intersection of classical and contemporary styles that the work exhibited. As was the case with the majority of artworks by friends in his collection, Girl Arranging Her Hair was handed over to Degas through a trade—he gave Cassat his 1886 Woman Bathing in a Shallow Tub in exchange.

Proof of Degas’s possession and appreciation for Girl Arranging her Hair is exemplified in a photograph of Degas inside his Paris apartment, where the work appears hanging in the salon. Girl Arranging Her Hair remained a part of Degas’s collection until his death in 1917.

With Cassatt’s piece remaining in Degas’s possession directly following its initial exhibition in 1886, many art connoisseurs mistook Girl Arranging Her Hair for being a work by Degas himself. This is revealed in a letter from Cassatt to future buyer Louisine Havemeyer:

The Degas sale will be a sensation. I am glad that in the collection of pictures by other painters he owned I will figure honorably, in fact they thought the two, a painting, and a pastel were his at first.

The work remained in Havemeyer’s collection until her death 1929. Following Havemeyer’s death, Girl Arranging Her Hair has passed through the American Arts Association, and is now housed at the Chester Dale collection of the National Gallery of Art.

== Composition and analysis ==
Girl Arranging Her Hair does not closely resemble Cassatt’s usual style, which was characterized by refined techniques and much attention to detail. In contrast, Girl Arranging Her Hair exhibits a greater emphasis on drawing, and shows Cassatt’s progression as an artist toward a more controlled approach. In terms of subject matter, Girl Arranging Her Hair resembles other works by Cassatt in representing a scene from everyday life. However, Cassatt pushes artistic boundaries by acknowledging the young girl’s awkwardness.

Cassatt deliberately selected an unconventional subject, employing an individual traditionally considered unattractive, akin to a crude servant. The young girl, positioned beside a dressing table, is depicted in the act of preparing for bed. Her left hand rests at the back of her neck, clutching a braid, while her right hand tends to it. This rendering captures an almost complete profile, highlighting the open mouth and conveying a sense of weariness and perceived stupidity.

The natural pose that the girl holds is also unconventional, as it captures her self-consciousness, which allows Cassatt to create a clear personality. The pose alludes to Michelangelo’s Bound Slave, which represents a state of extreme bondage. Some scholars have suggested that the young girl is imagining how the male gaze will receive her appearance.

Cassatt’s experimental approach to this piece is further evident in her juxtaposition of ugliness and beauty, a technique she learned from her interactions with Degas. The work integrates a supposedly unappealing model into a painting with beautiful form, composition, color, and light.

== See also ==
- List of works by Mary Cassatt
