= Young Mother Sewing (Mary Cassatt) =

Painting by Mary Cassatt

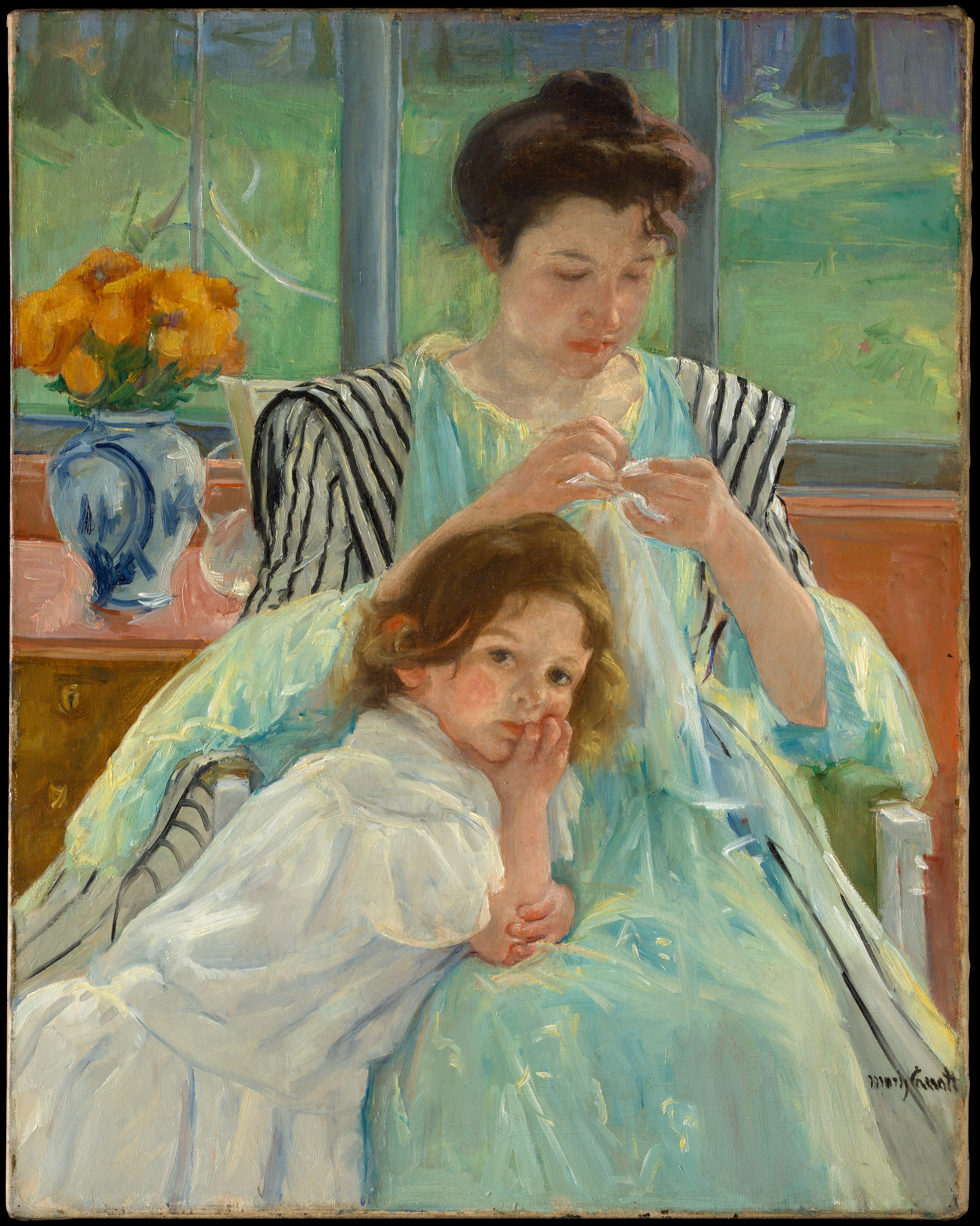
- Artist: Mary Cassatt
- Year: 1900
- Medium: Oil on canvas
- Dimensions: 92.4 cm × 73.7 cm (36.4 in × 29.0 in)
- Location: Metropolitan Museum of Art; New York
- Accession: 29.100.48

Young Mother Sewing aka Little Girl Leaning on her Mother's Knee is a 1900 painting by the American artist Mary Cassatt. It is in the collection of the Metropolitan Museum of Art.

== Early history and creation ==
Mary Cassatt created the oil painting in 1900. It was purchased in Paris from Durand-Ruel by Louisine Havemeyer in 1901. Havemeyer became a widow in 1907 and she devoted her time to the suffrage movement. In 1912 she lent her artistic collection including this painting to Knoedler's Gallery in New York to raise money for the cause. In 1913, she founded what would become the National Woman's Party with the radical suffragist Alice Paul. Havemeyer repeated the money raising art exhibition for women's suffrage at Knoedler's in 1915.

== Later history and display ==
The painting was bequeathed to the Metropolitan Museum in 1929, as part of the H.O. Havemeyer Collection. The painting has been widely exhibited while on loan from the Metropolitan Museum at such venues as the Museum of Modern Art, NY; the National Gallery of Art, Washington, DC; the Parish Art Museum, Southampton, NY; Newark Museum, NJ; Mint Museum of Art, Charlotte, NC; Santa Barbara Museum of Art, Santa Barbara, CA, Newport Harbor Art Museum, Newport, CA, among others.

== Description and interpretation ==
The work depicts a mother engaged in the act of sewing while seated in front of a window. A young child in a white dress leans on her mother's lap while gazing out of the picture plane toward the viewer. The woman wears a striped dress covered by a green apron that mirrors the greens in the grass outside the window. According to the Metropolitan Museum, the artist used two unrelated models as the mother and child.

== See also ==
- List of works by Mary Cassatt
