= Harriet Scott Chessman =

American novelist

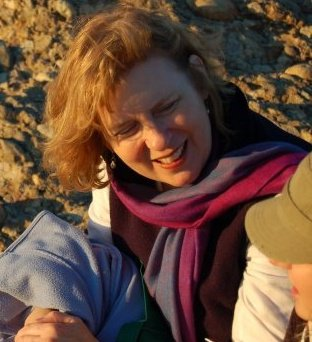
- Born: January 16, 1951 (age 75); Newark, Ohio, U.S.
- Education: Wellesley College (BA); Yale University (PhD)
- Occupation: Novelist
- Spouse: Bryan J. Wolf
- Writing career
- Period: 1999–present
- Genre: Literary fiction
- Notable works: Lydia Cassatt Reading the Morning Paper, Someone Not Really Her Mother
- Website: www.harrietchessman.com

Harriet Scott Chessman (born January 16, 1951) is an American author of four novels, including Lydia Cassatt Reading the Morning Paper, a #1 Booksense Pick, Someone Not Really Her Mother, a Good Morning America book club choice, and The Beauty of Ordinary Things. Chessman's subjects often center on mortality, love, trauma, and the restorative power of art.

== Biography ==
Harriet Scott Chessman grew up in the Welsh Hills of Ohio. She received her PhD in English from Yale University in 1979, and her B.A. cum laude from Wellesley College in 1972. She has taught literature and creative writing at Yale University, Bread Loaf School of English, and Stanford University's Continuing Studies Program. She lived for twelve years in Palo Alto, California, with her husband Bryan J. Wolf, the Jeannette and William Hayden Jones Professor in American Art and Culture at Stanford University. She now lives in Connecticut.

== Bibliography ==
=== Novels ===
- Ohio Angels (1999)
- Lydia Cassatt Reading the Morning Paper (2001)
- Someone Not Really Her Mother (2004)
- The Beauty of Ordinary Things (2013)

=== Scholarly works ===
- The Public is Invited to Dance: Representation, The Body, and Dialogue in Gertrude Stein (1989)
- Gertrude Stein: Writings (2 volumes), Library of America, co-editor (1995)

=== Libretti ===
- My Lai (2022)
