= The Cup of Tea =

Painting by Mary Cassatt

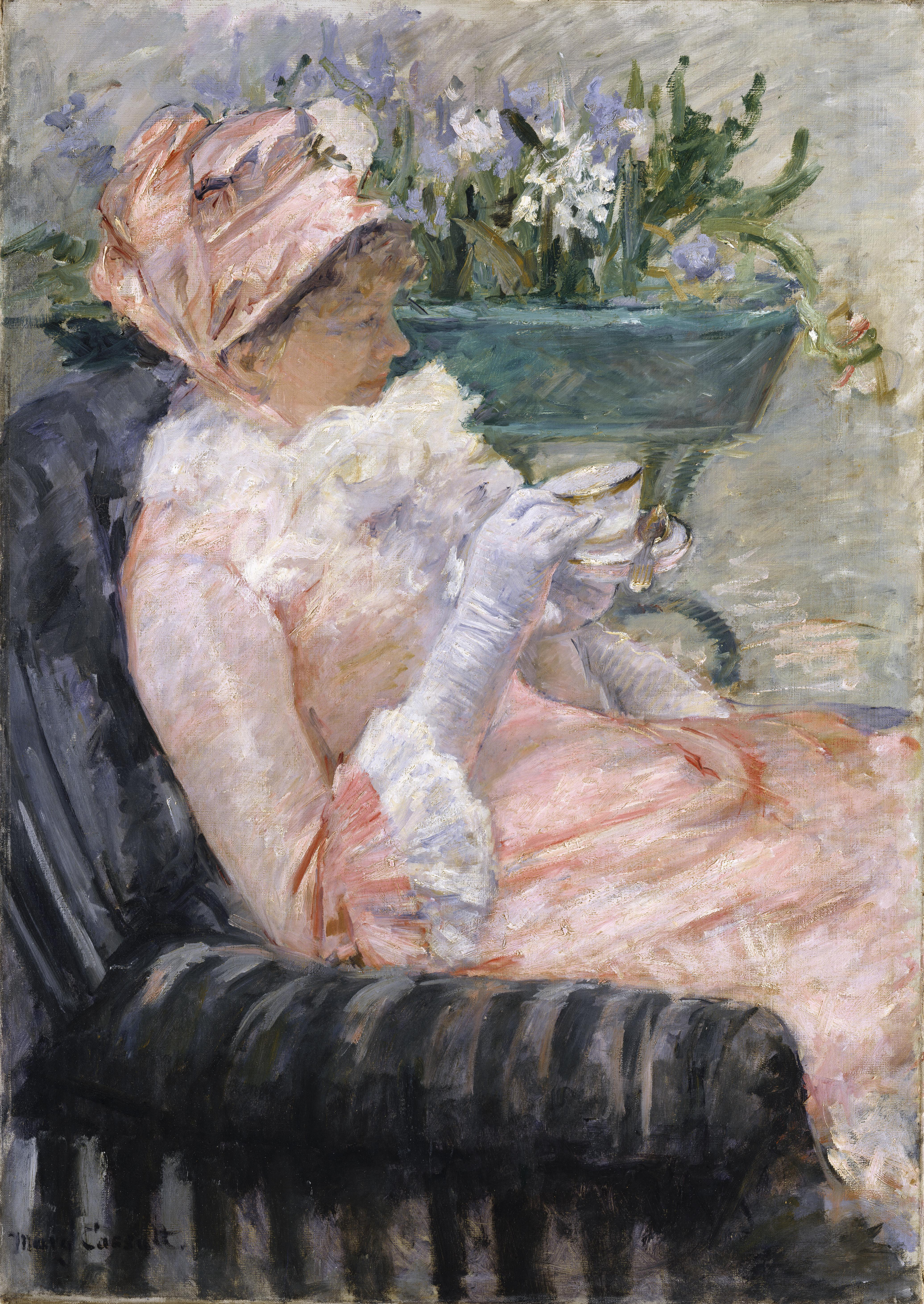
- Artist: Mary Cassatt
- Year: c. 1879-1881
- Medium: oil on canvas
- Dimensions: 92.4 cm × 65.4 cm (36.4 in × 25.7 in)
- Location: Metropolitan Museum of Art; New York
- Accession: 22.16.17

The American artist Mary Cassatt painted The Cup of Tea in Paris ca. 1879–1881. The painting depicts Mary's sister Lydia Cassatt in a typical, upper class-Parisian ritual of afternoon tea. Scholars have observed that Cassatt's choice to employ vivid colors, loose brushstrokes, and novel perspective to portray the scene makes it a quintessentially Impressionist painting.

It is unclear when this painting was first exhibited. The painting is mentioned in Edgar Degas’s preliminary list of works for the Impressionist Exhibition of 1879. However, the post-exhibition catalog did not include The Cup of Tea. It was confirmed to have appeared in the Sixth Impressionist Exhibit of 1881 where it received much praise as well as criticism. The painting was later purchased by a retired American banker and friend of the Cassatt family, James Stillman. Today, the painting is in the collection of the Metropolitan Museum of Art in New York.

== Cassatt's identity ==
Cassatt was born in the United States in 1844 to parents Robert and Catherine Cassatt. She began her art career at the Pennsylvania Academy of Fine Arts in 1861 at the age of seventeen. Cassatt was dissatisfied with her art education and yearned to continue her career abroad. Her father was hesitant at first. He was concerned that it was inappropriate for his daughter of “means and social position” to pursue an artistic career. He eventually gave in, and the Cassatt family ended up following Mary to Paris to live with her.

Scholars have often seen paintings such as The Cup of Tea as an extension of Cassatt's social identity, but their interpretations differ. In his study of the artist, Frederick Sweet emphasized the importance of "the environment in which she lived and worked” and treated works such as The Cup of Tea as a natural extension of Cassatt's bourgeois milieu. The art historian Griselda Pollock, however, has emphasized the constraints that this identity imposed on Cassatt's choice of subject matter, observing that "for bourgeois women, going into town mingling with crowds of mixed social composition was not only frightening because it became increasingly unfamiliar, but because it was morally dangerous." Pollock argues that Cassatt would not have been able to access the same spaces as her male counterparts for concerns of safety and for her social standing. In addition to it being dangerous for a woman to go out alone in the city to paint, it would not have been socially acceptable for women to insert herself into spaces that did not align with her social status.

== Visual analysis ==
The scene shown in The Cup of Tea is a depiction of Mary Cassatt's sister Lydia partaking in a daily ritual exclusive to upper-class Parisian women. The gold-edged teacup along with the silver spoon are luxury items that indicate the high social status of the subject depicted. Lydia's hat and gloves reinforce the formality of the scene, and additionally suggest that she is a guest taking tea in another woman's home. Behind Lydia sits a green wicker planter full of white hyacinth flowers. Hyacinths typically represent beauty and pride, which further underscores the poise and elegance of the overall scene.

In their book on the paintings in the Metropolitan Museum of Art, John K. Howat and Natalie Spassky explain how The Cup of Tea exemplifies Cassatt's “commitment to Impressionism.” The depiction of the subject as well as the deliberate brushwork and coloring align with the Impressionist "idiom". While the painting presents a central figure (Lydia), this figure is not depicted in a typical portrait format. The awkward vantage point and cropping of the frame along with the off center placement of Lydia suggest that this painting is not primarily focused on the subject, but rather that it is focused on the scene as a whole.

Frederick Sweet further explains how the eloquent brushstrokes dissolve the line between subject and background and encourage the viewer to see the painting as an "overall conception", not as a portrait. John K. Howat goes on to write how colors are used to define objects and how the brushstrokes unite the composition. He claims that the use of the color pink throughout the composition ties the scene together. The light pink tones of the dress are mimicked on the underside of the chair and the saucer as well as by the gloves, woman's face, and the flowers. “Measured strokes of local” and contrasting colors are additionally used for shadows to "accentuate form" in this piece. For example, the white gloves are spotted with blue strokes that more clearly define their form. At the same time, these gloves are made up of “measured” brushstrokes of the recurring pink and white colors to maintain the sense of fluency throughout the piece, consistent with the Impressionist movement.

Helene Barbara Weinberg describes the space in the painting as “undefined.” Weinberg sees no clear boundaries between foreground and background and explains how this invokes a feeling of disorientation in the viewer. Weinberg suggests that the “protective embrace by a deep upholstered chair” offers a counterpoint to the spatial disorientation, grounding the viewer. Weinberg calls further attention to the artist's selective use of detail: “Cassatt’s emphasis on unexceptional details and events of daily life reflect her concern for anecdote rather than elaborate narrative.”

== Reception ==
Gustave Geffroy, a French art critic, praised Mary Cassatt's The Cup of Tea in an 1881 issue of the journal La Justice: “We prefer above all the woman in the pink dress and bonnet who holds a cup of tea in her gloved hands.” Geffroy goes on to write that Lydia is “exquisitely Parisian,” having been depicted with various nuances in color, texture, and lighting. He states that the variations of pink along with the free-flowing lace display a sense of "playful" femininity. He additionally admires how Cassatt uses reflection of light to highlight the clothing Lydia is wearing. Geffroy concludes by explaining how these artistic details come together to create “a delicious work.”

Charles-Albert d’Arnoux—otherwise known as Bertall, a French illustrator—takes a more critical stance toward The Cup of Tea in Paris-Journal in April 1881. He writes that the painting is “badly drawn and badly painted” and that “without color or modeling” this work is “inconsistent both in tone and form.” Rather than considering the possibility that Cassatt may have purposefully depicted her subject in this way, Bertall sees the style as being a reflection of Cassatt's lack of talent as an artist. By describing the whole of Cassatt's works as “unrealistic,” Bertall further refuses the possibility that this way of painting may have been intentional. Describing Cassatt's choice of subject matter, he writes: “we are not going to try to describe the confusion of women and young ladies in pink, fanning themselves in their chairs.” He further criticizes Cassatt's female subjects as being uninteresting and unimportant, describing them as merely “fanning themselves in their chairs.”

Henry Trianon offers a more ambiguous opinion in Le Constitutionnel on April 24, 1881, writing "Mary Cassatt, an English or American woman as her name indicates, also pays tribute to the sketch. Sometimes, however, she achieves an effect, almost a painting." He even goes on to say that the pot of flowers sitting behind the subject “adds its brilliant note to the charm of the overall tonality” of the work.

In a short comment in L’art moderne, Joris-Karl Huysmans admires the "smiling woman dressed in pink" who sits in her large chair and holds a "little teacup in her gloved hands." Huysmans's response praises this stereotypically feminine scene as well as Cassatt's use of techniques to accentuate the unique environment. He claims that the gloved hands and little teacup along with the use of pinks and bright colors add “the fine odor of Parisian elegance to the overall tender and peaceful air.”

== Feminist legacy ==
Upon seeing The Cup of Tea at the Impressionist Exhibition of 1881, artist Paul Gauguin wrote: "Miss Cassatt has as much charm, but she has more power." While Cassatt may have been confined to a certain "domestic realm", art historians argue that she used the resources she had available to create an identity as a respected female artist among a community of primarily male artists.

== See also ==
- List of works by Mary Cassatt
