= List of works by Mary Cassatt =

The following is a list of works by Mary Cassatt that are generally accepted as autograph by the Adelyn Dohme Breeskin catalog and other sources.

Image	Title	Year	Dimensions	Inventory nr.	Gallery	Location
	Picking flowers in a field	1875	10 1/2 in x 13 1/2 in		private collection	
	Little Girl in a Blue Armchair	1878	35 in x 51 in	1983.1.18	National Gallery of Art	Washington D.C.
	Woman with a Pearl Necklace	1879	31 5/8 in x 23 in	PMA 1978-1-5	Philadelphia Museum of Art	Philadelphia
	Lydia Leaning on Her Arms (in a theatre box)	1879	21 5/8 in x 17 3/4 in		Collection Mrs. William Coxe Wright	St. Davids, PA
	A Woman and a Girl Driving	1879	35 1/4 in x 51 1/2 in		Philadelphia Museum of Art	Philadelphia
	Lilacs in a Window	1879	24.2 in × 20.3 in	MMA 1997.207	Metropolitan Museum of Art	NYC
	In the Loge	1880	32 in x 26 in	10.35	Museum of Fine Arts, Boston	Boston
	Tea	1880	25 1/2 in x 36 1/4 in	42.178	Museum of Fine Arts Boston	Boston
	Mother About to Wash Her Sleepy Child	1880	39 1/2 in × 25 7/8 in	M.62.8.14	Los Angeles County Museum of Art	Los Angeles
	Susan on a Balcony holding a dog	1883	39 1/2 in × 25 1/2 in		Corcoran Gallery of Art	Washington D.C.
	Reading “Le Figaro”	1883	41 in x 33 in		Collection Mrs. Eric de Spoelberch	Haverford, Pennsylvania
	The Family	1886	32 in x 26 in		Chrysler Museum of Art	Norfolk, Virginia
	Girl Arranging Her Hair	1886	29 1/2 in x 24 1/2 in	1963.10.97	National Gallery of Art	Washington D.C.
	Emmie and her Child	1889	35 3/8 in x 25 3/8 in		Wichita Art Museum	Kansas
	Mrs. Robert S. Cassatt, the Artist's Mother	1889	38 in x 27 in	1979.35	Fine Arts Museums of San Francisco	San Francisco
	Young Woman in a Black and Green Bonnet	1890	25 9/16 x 20 1/2 in	x1953-119	Princeton University Art Museum	Princeton, New Jersey
	Baby's First Caress	1891	30 in x 24 in		New Britain Museum of American Art	New Britain, Connecticut
	The Letter	1891	13 5/8 in x 9 in		Art Institute of Chicago	Chicago
	The Child's Bath	1893	39 1/2 in × 26 in	1910.2	Art Institute of Chicago	Chicago
	Baby Reaching for an Apple	1893	39 in x 25 1/2 in		Mrs. Blaine Durham	Hume, VA
	The Boating Party	1893	35 1/2 in × 46 1/8 in	1963.10.94	National Gallery of Art	Washington D.C.
	Summertime	1894	29 in x 38 in		Armand Hammer Foundation	Los Angeles
	Ellen Mary Cassatt In A White Coat	1896	32 in x 24 in		private collection	
	Breakfast in Bed	1897	25 5/8 in × 29 in		Huntington Library	San Marino, California
	Under the Horse Chestnut Tree	1898	19 x 15 in		Museum of Fine Arts, Houston (this original), Library of Congress	Houston and Washington D.C.
	Gardner and Ellen	1899	25 in × 18 3/4 in	MMA 57.182	Metropolitan Museum of Art	NYC
	Madame A. F. Aude and Her Two Daughters	1899	21 3/8 in × 31 7/8 in		Collection Durand-Ruel	Paris
	Young Mother Sewing	1900	36 3/8 x 29 in	29.100.48	Metropolitan Museum of Art	New York City
	After the Bath	1901	25 3/4 in × 39 1/4 in		Cleveland Museum of Art	Cleveland
	Sara in Dark Bonnet Tied under her Chin	1901			Fred Jones Jr. Museum of Art	Norman, Oklahoma
	Reine LeFebvre Holding a Nude Baby	1902	26 7/8 in × 22 1/2 in		Worcester Art Museum	Worcester, MA
	Margot (Lefebvre) in Blue	1902	24 in × 19 5/8 in	37.303	Walters Art Museum	Baltimore
	Simone in a White Bonnet	1903	25 1/2 in × 16 1/2 in		private collection	Texas
	Mother and Child	1905	36 1/4 in x 29 in	1963.10.98	National Gallery of Art	Washington D.C.
	Françoise Holding a Little Dog	1906	26 7/8 in x 22 3/4 in	26.124	Huntington Library	San Marino, California
	Young Mother and Two Children	1908	34.63 cm x 43.62 cm		The White House	Washington D.C.
	Antoinette at her dressing table	1909	36 1/2 in x 28 1/2 in		Collection Mrs. Samuel E. Johnson	Chicago, Illinois
	Augusta Reading to Her Daughter	1910			Artizon Museum	Tokyo, Japan
	The Crochet Lesson	1913	30 1/8 in x 25 1/2 in		Collection Melville and Estelle Gelman	Washington D.C.
	Mother, Young daughter, and Son	1913	43 1/4 in. x 33 1/4 in		Memorial Art Gallery	Rochester, NY

== Sources ==
- Mary Cassatt, Oils and Pastels, by E. John Bullard, Watson-Guptill Publications, New York in cooperation with the National Gallery, Washington, D.C., 1972
