= Arvo Leo =

Canadian interdisciplinary artist and filmmaker

Arvo Leo (born 1981) is a Canadian interdisciplinary artist and filmmaker whose work explores themes of ecology, Indigeneity, and the poetics of everyday life. His practice often blends ethnographic methods with imaginative storytelling, resulting in films, installations, and performances that challenge conventional narratives.

== Early life and education ==
Arvo Leo was born in 1981. He grew up in Roberts Creek, British Columbia, Canada. He earned a Bachelor of Media Arts from Emily Carr University in Vancouver and a Master of Fine Arts from the Piet Zwart Institute in Rotterdam, Netherlands.

== Artistic practice ==
Leo's work spans video, film, poetry, performance, and installation. He is known for his lyrical sensibility, blending documentary observation with elements of surrealism and play. His projects often involve collaborations with diverse communities, integrating local histories, myths, and knowledge systems. One of his most notable works is Fish Plane, Heart Clock (2014), a feature-length film that celebrates and responds to the work of Inuit hunter-turned-artist Pudlo Pudlat (1916–1992). The film collages images of Pudlat's drawings with footage Leo captured during his time in Kinngait (Cape Dorset), offering a meditation on cultural transformation and artistic expression.

=== Exhibitions and screenings ===
Leo's work has been exhibited and screened internationally at venues such as:

- Berlinale Forum Expanded (2015)
- Biennale of Moving Images, Museum of Old and New Art, Tasmania (2015)
- La Loge, Brussels (2015)
- Kunstverein München (2016)
- Framer Framed, Amsterdam (2019)
- Biennial of Moving Images, Geneva (2014)
- Stedelijk Museum’s-Hertogenbosch (2011)
- Glasgow Biennial (2010)
- Contemporary Art Gallery, Vancouver, BC (Year)
- Museu d’Art Contemporani de Barcelona (Year)

== Residencies and projects ==
In 2021, Leo was an artist-in-residence at ARTIS in Amsterdam, where he focused on the relationship between humans, animals, and plants. During his residency, he created works on paper and developed a flower meadow at the front of the Rijksakademie building, utilizing giraffe manure from ARTIS for fertilization.

== Selected works ==
- Fish Plane, Heart Clock (2014)
- The Orchids / Had the Look of Flowers That Are Looked At (2018)
