= Une loge aux Théâtre Italiens =

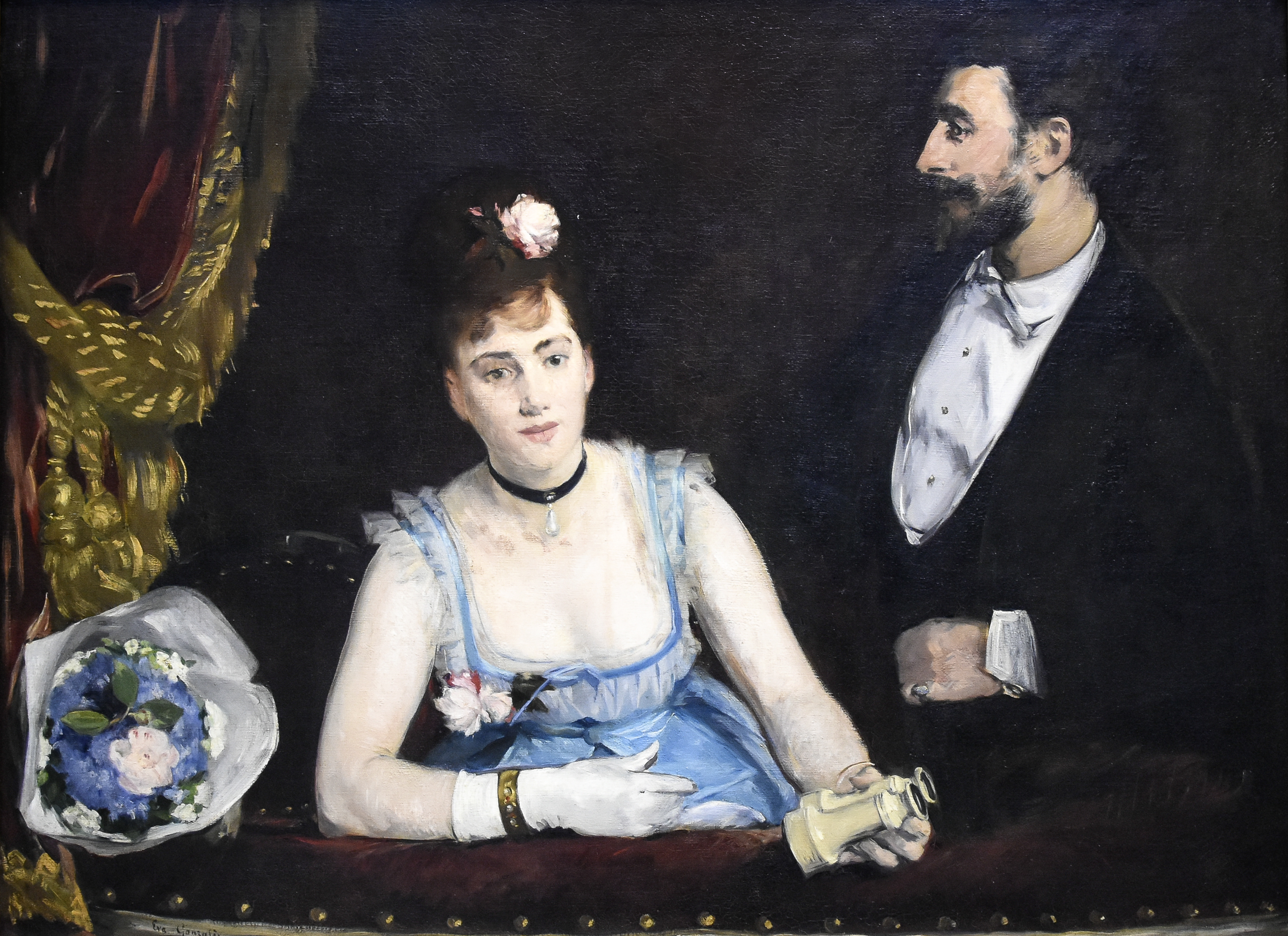
- Year: 1874
- Location: Musée d'Orsay

Une loge aux Théâtre Italiens is an 1874 painting by the French artist Eva Gonzalès. The horizontal, oil-on-canvas composition depicts a seated woman and a standing man in a theater box at the Théâtre-Italien in Paris. The work was exhibited at the Paris Salon of 1879 and it is now held in the Musée d'Orsay. Many scholars note the painting's significance within a broader nineteenth-century trend of depicting the theater box, and some have interpreted the work in relation to gender roles and hierarchies of Gonzalès's time.

== Background ==
Gonzalès painted Une loge aux Théâtre Italiens in 1874, with Jeanne Constance Philippe, her sister, and Henri Guérard, whom she married in 1879, serving as models. The work is sized at 98 x 130 cm (38.6 x 51.2 in). The theater box setting became a popular motif among some of Gonzalès's contemporaries, notably Impressionist artist Mary Cassatt who depicted this setting in In the Loge and The Loge. Yet, scholars note that it was considered a relatively original subject for large-scale painting in 1874 when Gonzalès took it on, only previously associated with satirical prints and illustrations.

Gonzalès submitted Une loge aux Théâtre Italiens to the official Salon in 1874, but it was rejected by the Salon jury. Following this rejection, Gonzalès exhibited the work at the Salon triennal in Ghent and, according to some scholars, the 1875 Salon des Réfusés. Other scholars dispute this point, writing that Gonzalès only participated in the Salon des Réfusés once, in 1873. Une loge aux Théâtre Italiens was eventually accepted to the official Salon in 1879. The painting was present at Gonzalès's estate sale in 1885, but was "overlooked" by the French state. It was shown again at the 1900 Paris Exposition, then was donated to the Louvre by Gonzalès's son, Jean Raymond Guérard, in 1927. Une loge aux Théâtre Italiens is currently housed at the Musée d'Orsay, where it has been held since 1986.

== Analysis ==
Une loge aux Théâtre Italiens depicts a young woman in fashionable attire seated in a theater box at the Théâtre-Italien in Paris. She is accompanied by a young man standing to her side, looking left towards a subject outside of the frame. Broadly, scholars consider the work notable for its depiction of contemporary life on a large scale, which had been formerly reserved for history paintings and heroic subjects. This decision was striking at the time because Gonzalès, as a female artist, was expected to work within the narrow constraints of the domestic sphere and small-scale genre paintings. From the perspective of some historians, this work thus "placed Gonzalès at the forefront of avant-garde".

The theater box was of interest to artists like Gonzalès because the opera was a social spectacle. While the performers were on display, so too were members, especially female, of the audience. In Une loge aux Théâtre Italiens, scholars note that Gonzalès's female subject is on display. She is adorned in jewels and elaborate clothing and, as indicated by the red curtain on the left edge of the painting, is seated in the theater box closest to the stage, which was the most expensive, elite, and visible seat at the opera. The figure leans forward and is positioned to directly meet the viewer's gaze, with posture that some scholars describe as assertive. In their view, this position contrasts with the traditionally passive role of women in social settings like these, where they were meant to be objects of observation. Additionally, her intent gaze towards the viewer indicates thoughtful engagement with the scene on the stage, interpreted by some scholars as evidence of her independence and intelligence. From this perspective, the female figure's dominant position is contrasted with the comparatively subordinate position of the male figure, who is not attentive to the scene on stage and, according to one critic, is "less concerned with seeing than being seen".

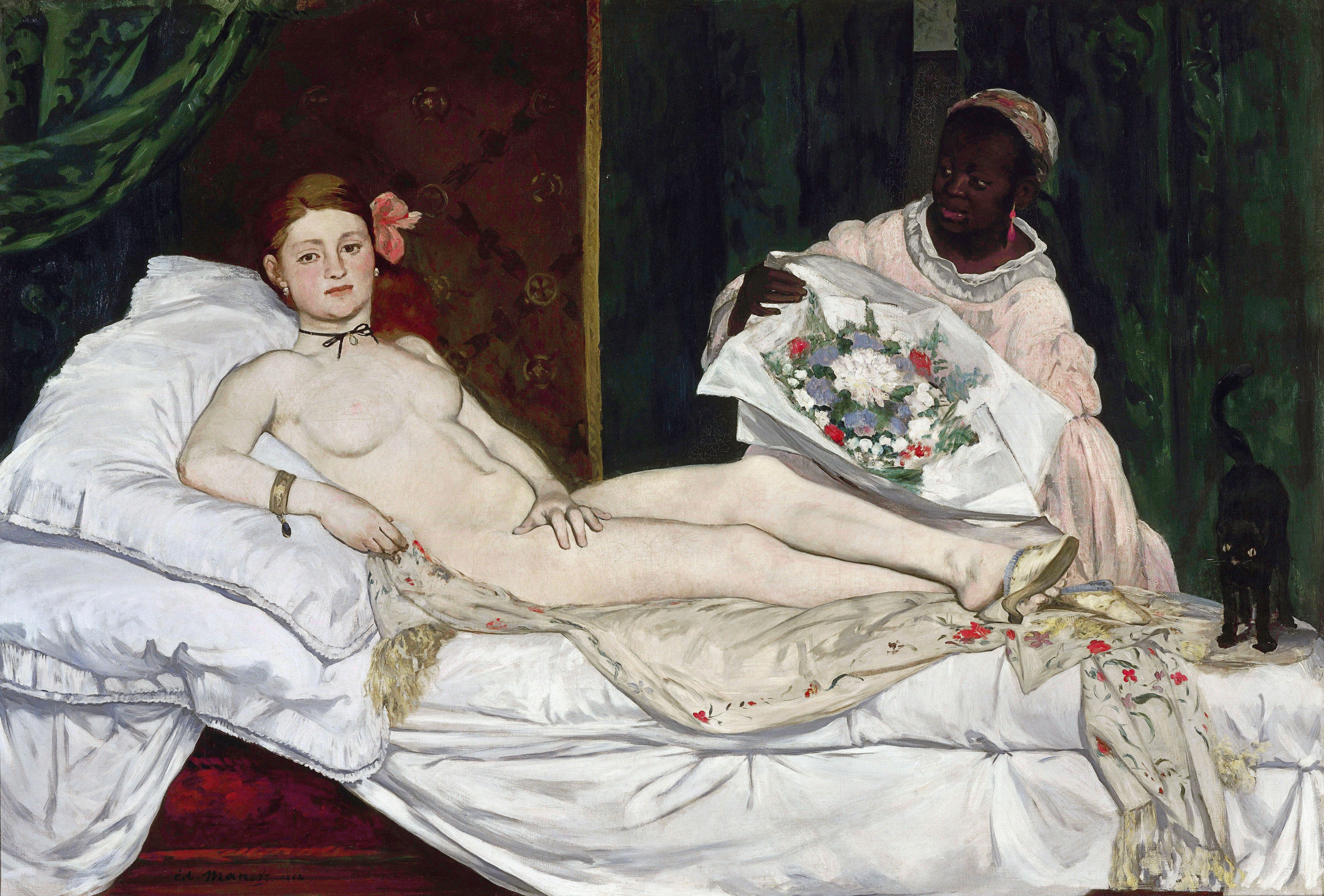
Olympia, Édouard Manet, 1863

Other scholars disagree with this feminist interpretation of Une loge aux Théâtre Italiens, arguing that the painting "neatly [encapsulates] the notion of man as the bearer of the look, woman as its object". Scholars with this view note similarity between the bouquet of flowers in the lower corner of this painting and that in Édouard Manet's Olympia, interpreting this element as a symbol of sensuality and seduction.

Scholars also identify technical similarities between Manet's work and Une loge aux Théâtre Italiens. The work features sweeping brushstrokes, a lack of shading, and prominent use of black which adhere to technical approaches associated with Manet's work while rejecting academic conventions. Scholars note the import of Gonzalès's decisions, like the dramatic contrast between the woman's pale complexion and the dark theater box in creating a sense of hazy artifice, conveying the unnatural theater lighting.

== Critical reactions ==
Though initially deemed "radical" and rejected from the Salon for its "masculine vigor," more progressive critics like Edmond Duranty commended Gonzalès for her painting's "boldness" and "originality". Maria Deraismes was struck by Une loge aux Théâtre Italiens when she saw it displayed in Gonzalès's atelier, proclaiming that it has an "aura of life and truth that makes you stop in front of it". When the work was shown at the Salon in 1879, it was celebrated by a variety of voices including Philippe Burty, Zacharie Astruc, Émile Zola, and Joris-Karl Huysmans.

== Related works ==
In 1874, Manet began A Couple in a Theatre Box (also called In the Loge), a pastel drawing depicting a couple in a theater box. Eva Gonzalès served as a model for this work, before it was abandoned by Manet. Nonetheless, scholars consider it a sure influence on Une loge aux Théâtre Italiens.

Pierre-Auguste Renoir also expressed interest in the world of the theater in his 1874 work, La Loge. Though Renoir and Gonzalès would have been connected through Manet, it is unclear whether their works directly influenced each other. La Loge and Une loge aux Théâtre Italiens depict similar subject matter, but there are notable differences between the works, with scholars contrasting the assertiveness of Gonzalès's female figure to the vulnerability of Renoir's, more clearly a spectacle to be gazed at.

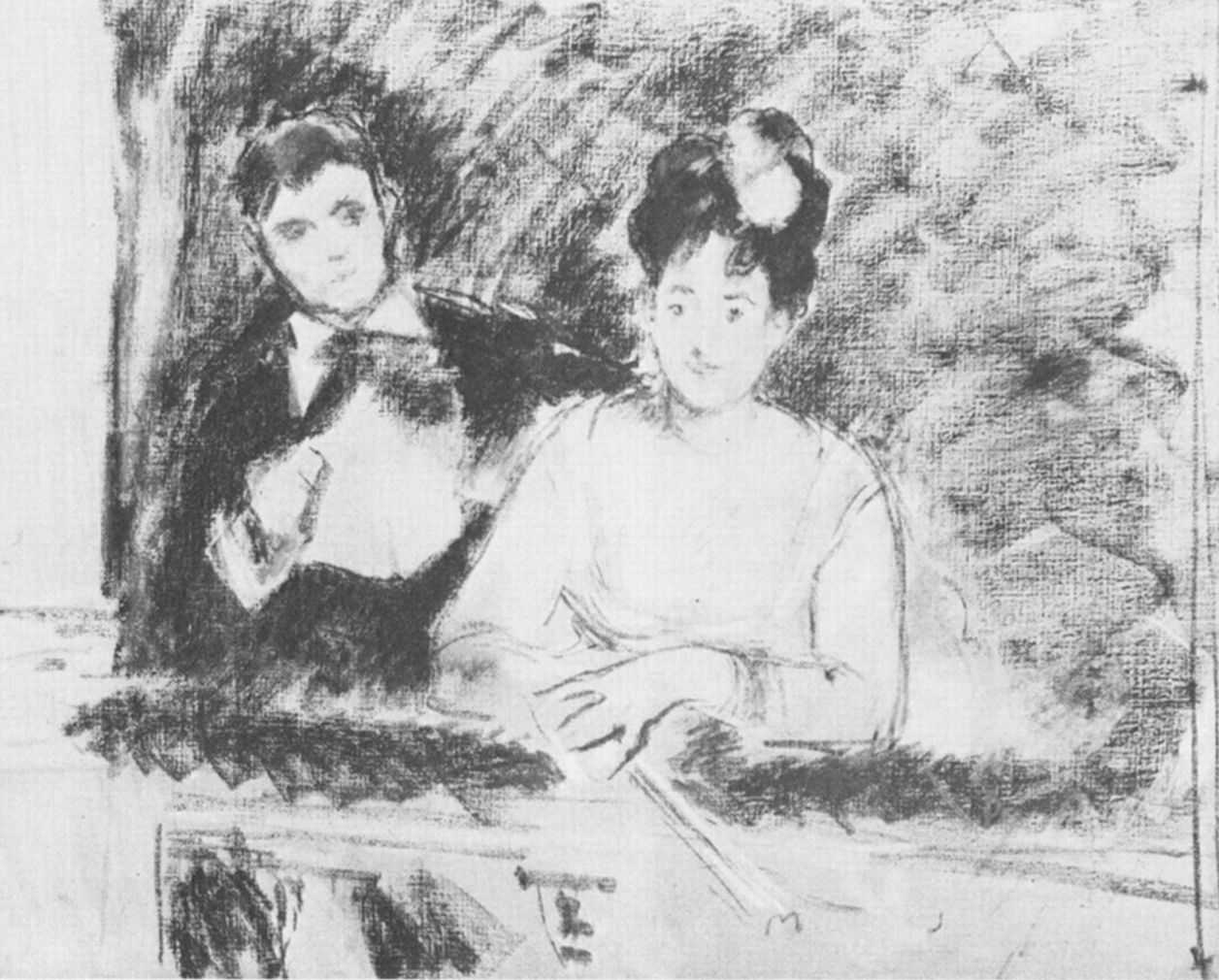
Édouard Manet, A Couple in a Theatre Box, 1874

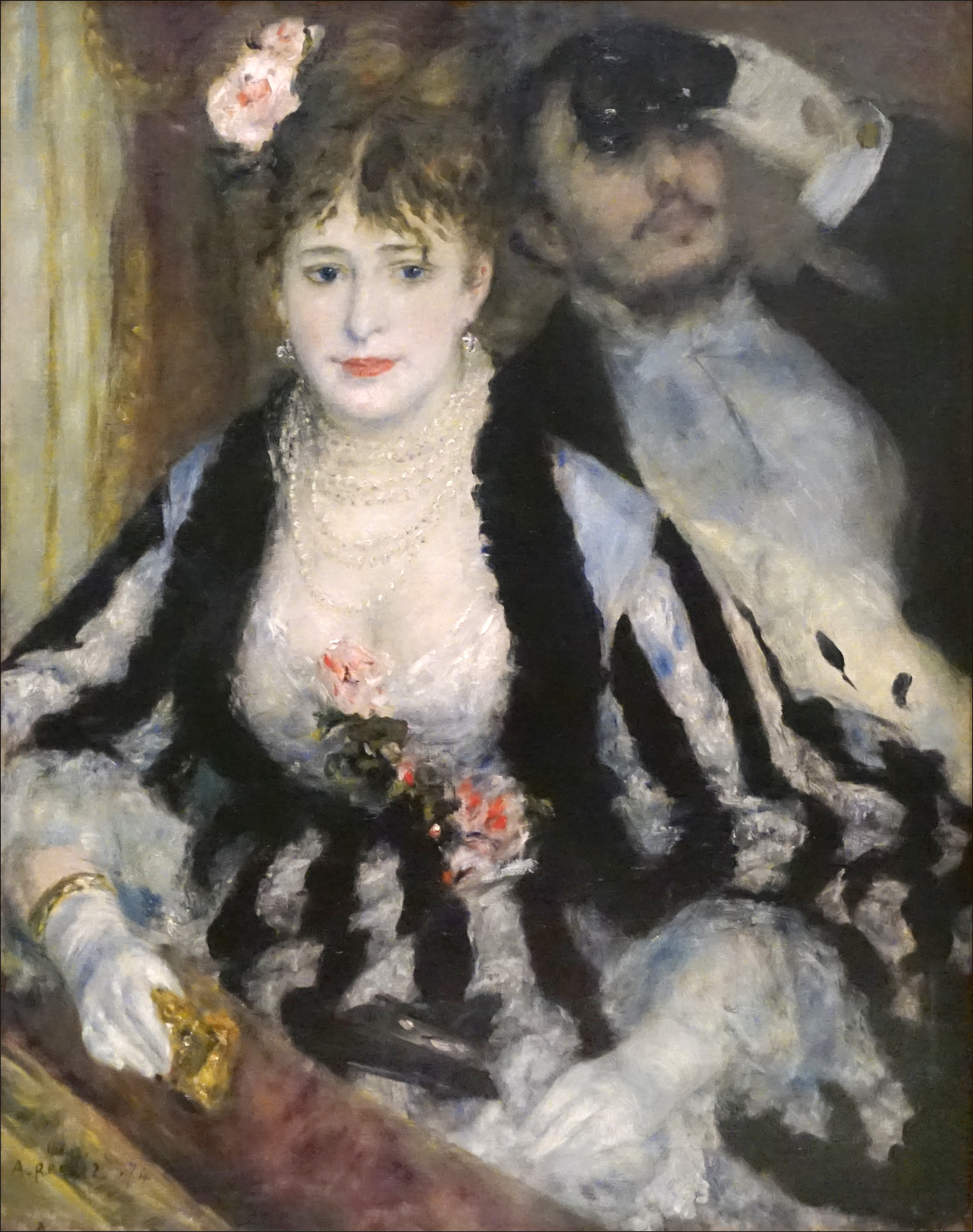
Pierre-Auguste Renoir, La Loge, 1874
