= In the Loge =

1878 painting by Mary Cassatt

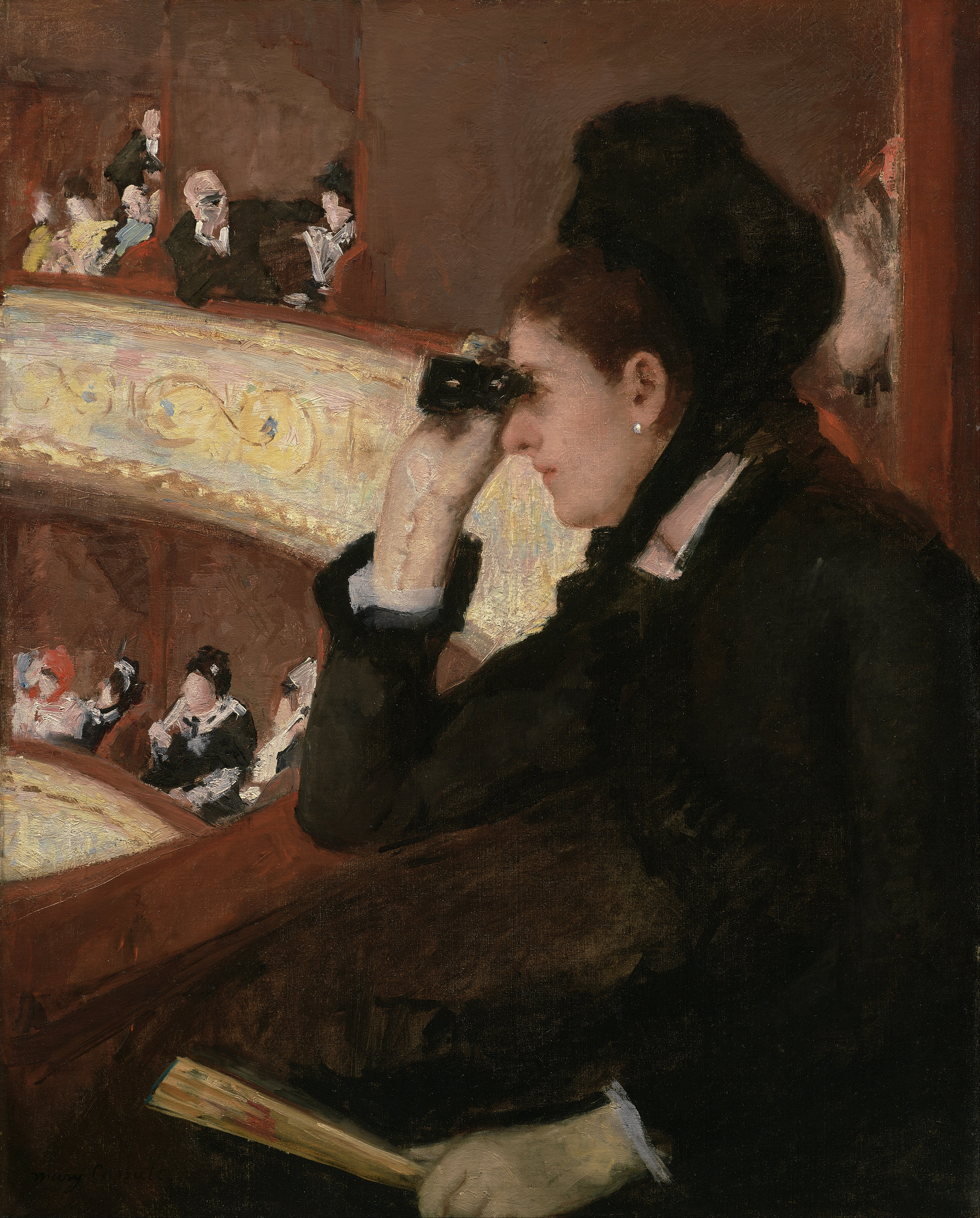
- Artist: Mary Cassatt
- Year: 1878
- Medium: Oil on canvas
- Dimensions: 81 cm × 66 cm (32 in × 26 in)
- Location: Museum of Fine Arts; Boston

In the Loge, also known as At the Opera, is an 1878 impressionist painting by the American artist Mary Cassatt. The oil-on-canvas painting is currently in the Museum of Fine Arts in Boston, which also holds a preliminary drawing for the work. The painting displays a bourgeois woman in a loge at the opera house looking through her opera glasses, while a man in the background looks at her. The woman's costume and fan make clear her upper class status. Art historians see the painting as commentary on the role of gender, looking, and power in the social spaces of the nineteenth century.

== Background ==
=== Personal identity ===
Cassatt's female subjects are often seen as an extension of her personal life. Cassatt had an early passion for painting and convinced her father to allow her to attend art school at a time when it was unusual for women to do so. After her father gave her permission to study at the Pennsylvania Academy of the Fine Arts, she moved to Paris, where she practiced as a painter and exhibited with the Impressionists. The art historian Susan Yeh has argued that Cassatt's female subjects, like Cassatt herself, overcome gender stereotypes and pursue independence.

=== Impressionism ===
Cassatt was introduced to Impressionism by Edgar Degas. Impressionist painters often painted social settings such as cafes, popular boulevards, and opera houses. This new movement satisfied Cassatt's desire to make art that was relevant to modern life. Like other Impressionist painters, Cassatt used loose brushstrokes to capture fleeting moments in time. Cassatt was empowered by the Impressionists to choose her own subject matter, ignoring the historical genres favored by the French Academy.

== Setting ==
In the Loge takes place in an elevated floor of an opera house. During the 19th century, the opera house was not only a place to watch a performance, but also a social gathering where high-class and bourgeois people would mingle. It served as one of the only social settings that women could freely attend. Cassatt's choice of setting for In the Loge has been interpreted by scholars as a means of highlighting the growing agency of women in nineteenth-century society.

=== Similar paintings ===
Mary Cassatt produced several other paintings depicting scenes in the opera house, such as The Loge and Woman with a Pearl Necklace in a Loge. Pierre Auguste Renoir also depicted a similar subject in La Loge (The Theatre Box), but his approach to the subject differs from Cassatt's. While Renoir paints his female subjects in order to display their physical features, Cassatt gives her female subject a more active role.

The Loge, Mary Cassatt

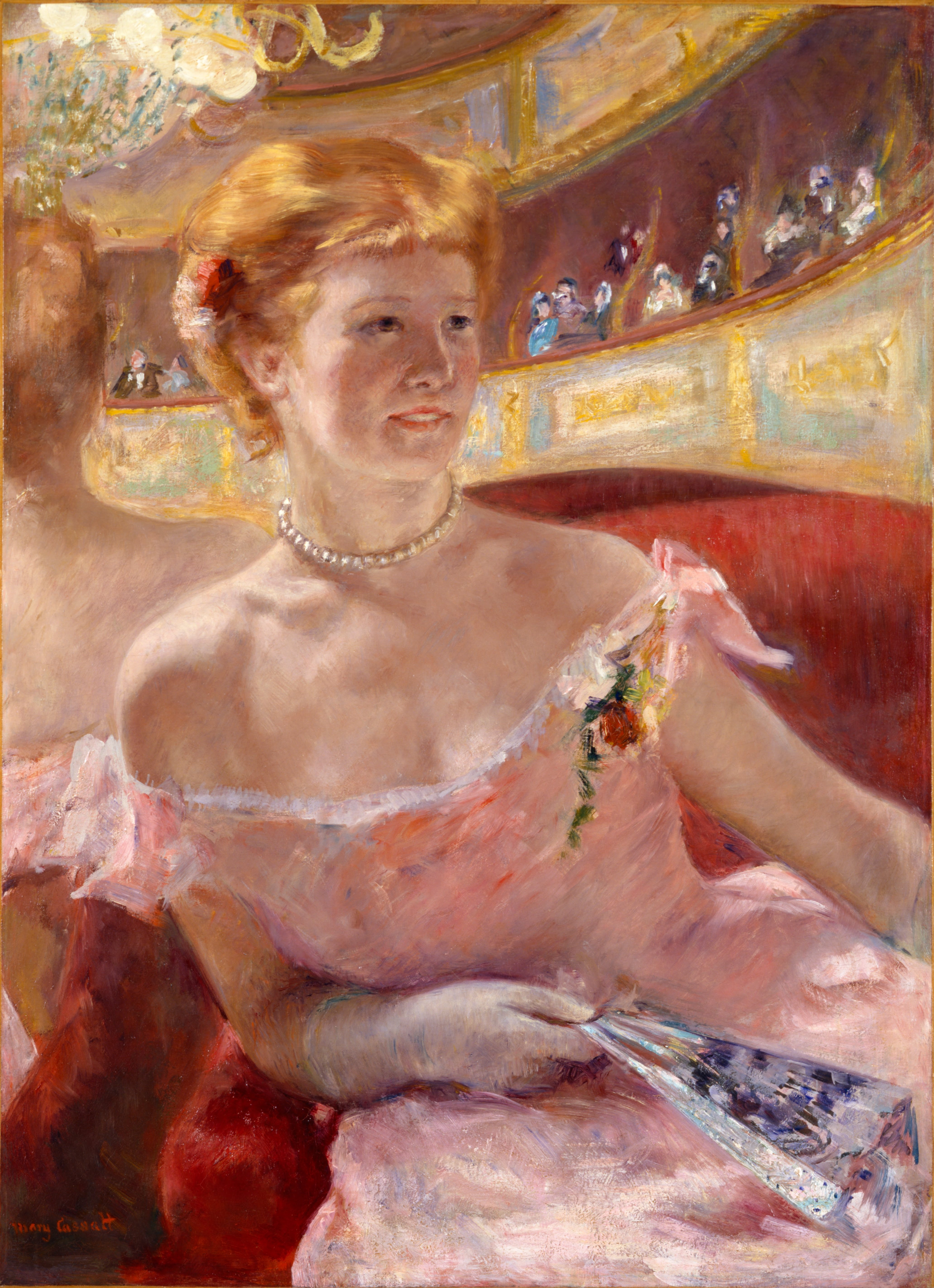
Woman with a Pearl Necklace, Mary Cassatt

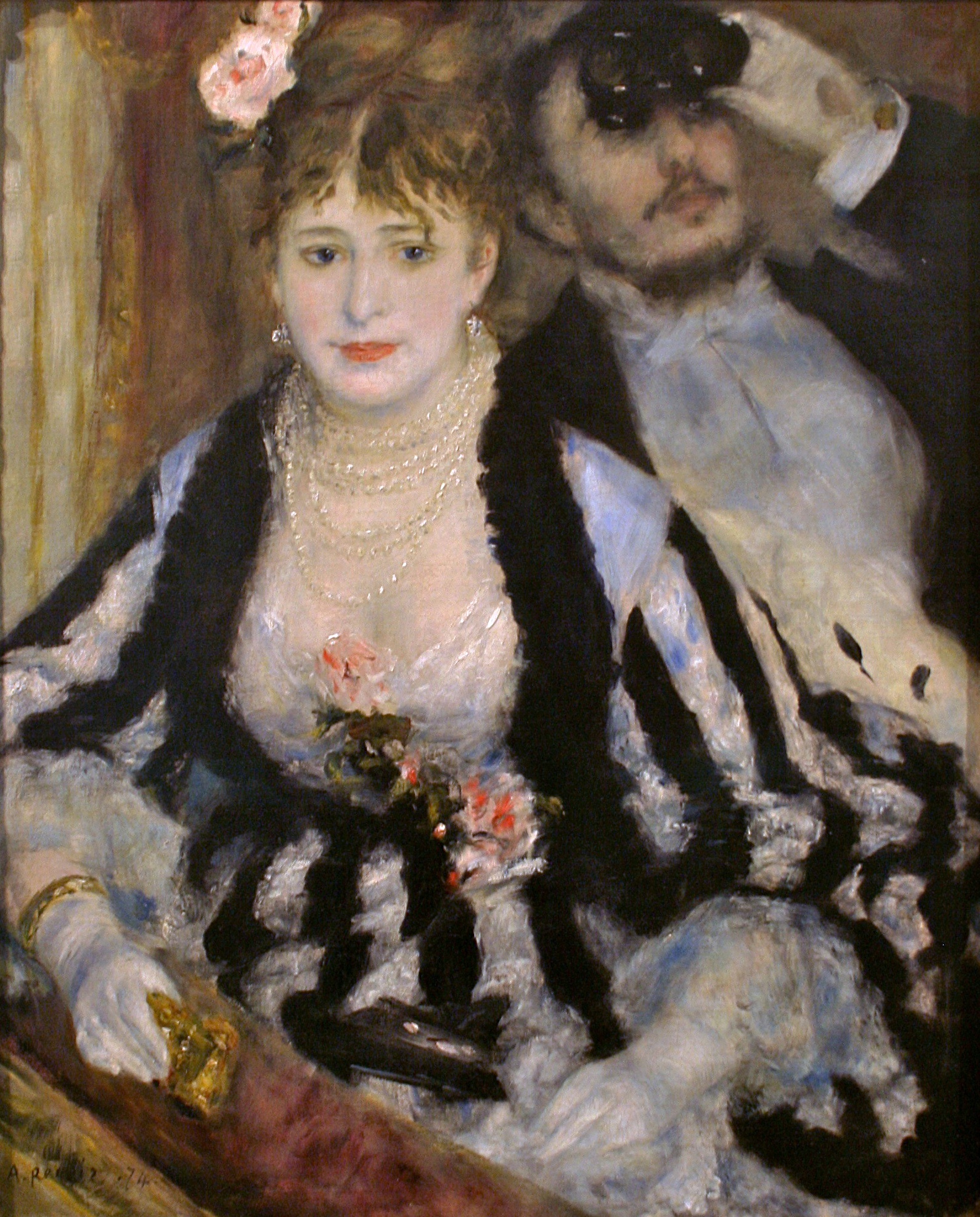
La Loge, Pierre-Auguste Renoir

== Feminism ==
Women were almost exclusively the subject for Cassatt's paintings and she became known for her representation of females.

While femininity during the nineteenth century was frequently associated with domestic space, Cassatt sometimes depicted the movement of women into public space, capturing the evolution of gender norms. Though permitted, it was a risk for a woman's reputation to enter spaces like an opera house. Cassatt engaged with this modern reality by painting women in the few public spaces that were accessible to them.

=== Body language ===
In In the Loge, the woman is seen sitting up straight, taking up most of the foreground of the image. Her elbow rests against the railing as she holds up her opera glasses. Her body language is confident, suggesting power. Her facial expression is alert, demonstrating her curiosity. The woman may be aware of the man staring at her, yet does not let that distract from what she is watching.

=== Power of the gaze ===
The woman continues to actively look through her glasses despite the man in her side view. Refusing to look in his direction, the female protagonist is asserting her independence in the space. The two figures looking through their opera glasses reflects the broader dynamics of gender in public space.

The audience also plays a unique role in the painting. As one looks at the painting, one stares at the woman, much like the man in the back.

== Commissioning ==
In the Loge was one of Cassatt's first pieces to be presented in the United States, when it was exhibited in Boston in 1878. The work remained in the possession of the artist's family until 1893 or 1894, when Cassatt sold it to Martin, Camentron, and Company in Paris. The painting entered the Museum of Fine Arts, Boston in 1910.

== See also ==
- List of works by Mary Cassatt
- Portrait of a Lady on Fire - a direct connection is made by the LA Review of Books
