= Woman with a Pearl Necklace in a Loge =

Painting by Mary Cassatt

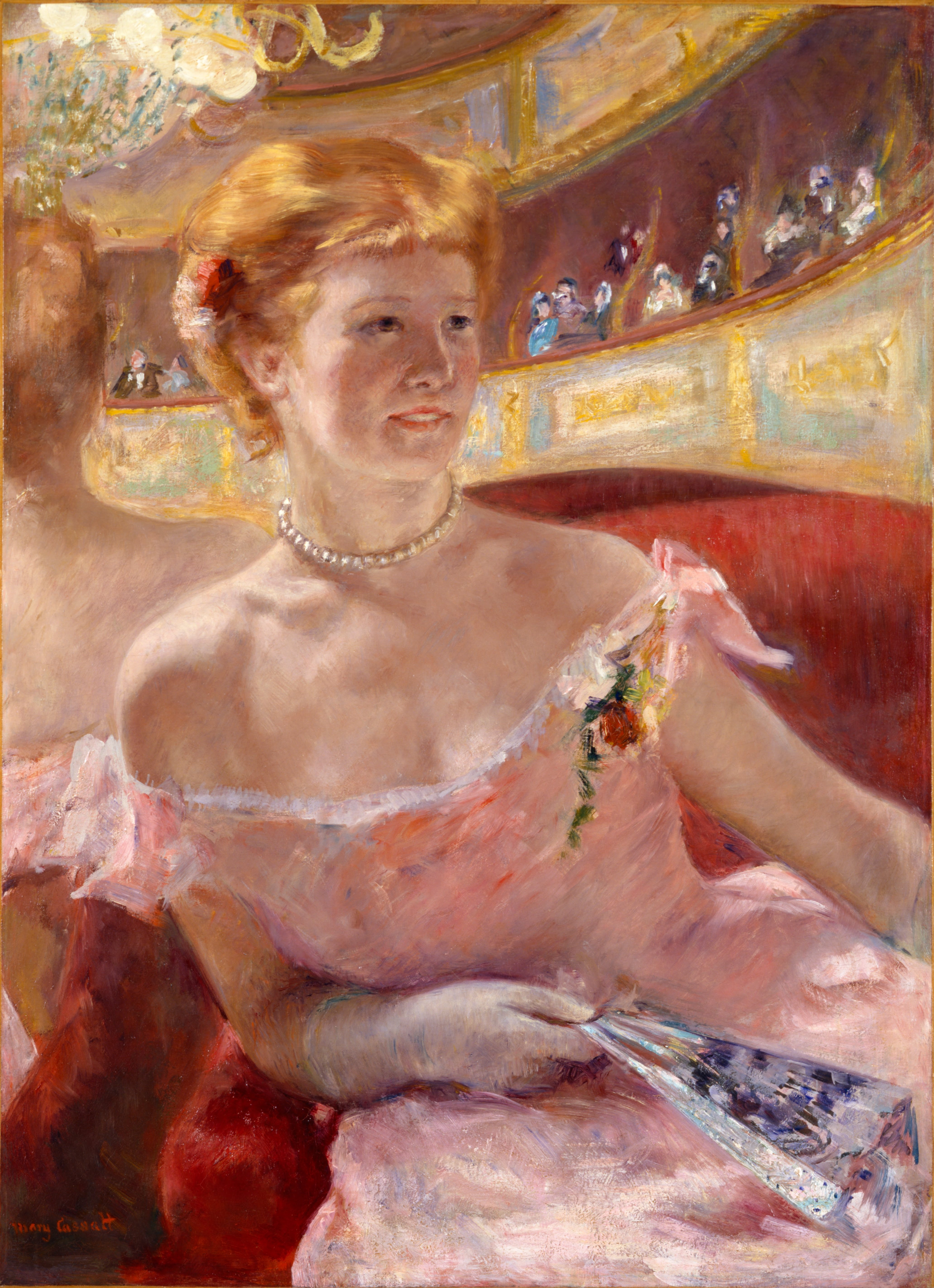
- Artist: Mary Cassatt
- Year: 1879
- Medium: oil on canvas
- Dimensions: 81 cm × 60 cm (32 in × 23.5 in)
- Location: Philadelphia Museum of Art, Philadelphia

Woman with a Pearl Necklace in a Loge (or Lydia in a Loge) is an 1879 painting by American artist Mary Cassatt. The Philadelphia Museum of Art acquired the painting in 1978 from the bequest of Charlotte Dorrance Wright. The style in which it was painted and the depiction of shifting light and color was influenced by Impressionism. This painting shows a view of the modern woman and is similar in style to Degas.

== Description ==
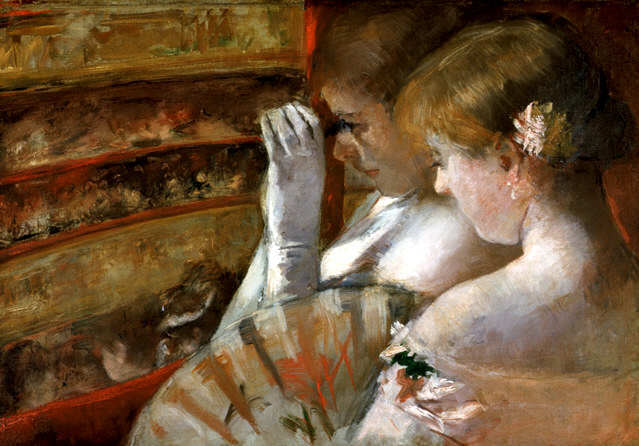
Mary Cassatt, In the Box, oil on canvas, 1879, Private Collection

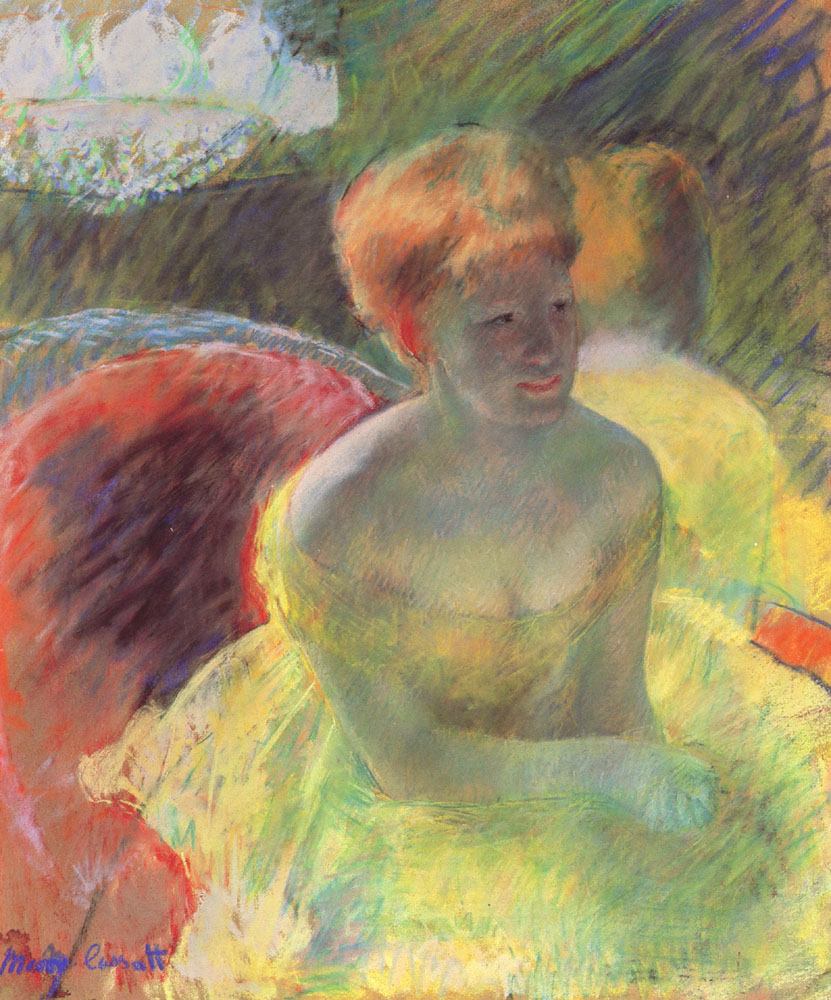
Mary Cassatt, At the Theater, oil on canvas, 21 5/8 in x 17 3/4 in, 1879, Collection Mrs. William Coxe Wright

Mary Cassatt, The Loge, oil on canvas, 32 in x 26 in, 1880, National Gallery of Art, Washington, D.C.

This oil on canvas painting is 32 x 23 1/2 inches (81.3 x 59.7 cm). The painting shows a woman sitting on a large red chair in the balconies of the Paris Opéra House. The figure is seated in front of a massive mirror that is reflecting the theater scene that the woman is experiencing; it is also giving us the view point that the woman is having. As with Degas, Cassatt paid close attention to the "effects of artificial lighting on flesh tones". The woman is sitting enjoying the sights, the city nightlife that most Impressionists were fascinated with, as she people watches. She is dressed up, as with what was expected of going to a theater, with a peach colored dress, makeup, pearls, gloves and hair pinned back. She is holding a fan and a flower is attached to the bodice of the dress. She looks bemused with what she is seeing. The quick painterly style of Impressionist paintings can be seen here as Cassatt was heavily inspired by it. The background is very gestural and loose as people are carved out in simple brush marks of color. An elaborate chandelier is also shown in the reflection of the mirror. The rich colors of the painting draw the viewer in, deep shadows create contrast against the brightness of the light source. The brush strokes within the dress itself give a texture to it and a liveliness to the piece. Cassatt paints her sister up close, giving the viewer a place in the opera box next to Lydia.

Being a genre painter she was able to reproduce scenes of everyday life, domestic settings and parties, which she would romanticize to help create an ethereal air of wonder around the women she painted.

Besides the quick brush strokes that was indicative of Impressionist paintings, Cassatt also implemented the tipped perspective that was common in many of Degas' paintings. This caused the viewers to never be quite able to figure out where in the painting they would be standing if they were present in that scene.

== Other work in the series ==
Cassatt depicted the modern woman, giving her an elegance and beauty. "There is nothing more graciously honest and aristocratic than her portraits of young women". "Glamour, fashionable costume, exquisitely tasteful settings served to create an idea that was understood to be intensely modern, a pale legacy of the poet". She painted women of the emerging middle/upper class engaged in leisure activities such as attending the theater. Because of this she is considered a Realist because of her portrayal of women in daily lives, such as working women or women of leisure. The way in which she depicted the working-class woman in "maternal solicitude or personal anxiety are framed within" these narratives. She was also considered to be a Post-Impressionist.

Cassatt used her sister Lydia as the model for some of her paintings, such as Woman with a Pearl Necklace in a Loge. Cassatt and her sister were both living in France in 1877. Around this time Cassatt became close friends with Degas, and his influence can be seen in her work. Cassatt did a series of theater scenes, such as In the Box which was made in 1879 and The Loge from 1882.

Cassatt used Lydia in other paintings such as At the Theater which was made in 1879; it shows Lydia sitting in possibly the same red chair and leaning forward so that her arms are resting on her knees. The vast scene from Woman with a Pearl Necklace in a Loge isn't present here as the mirror is reflecting a dark room to the viewer. The chandelier and elegant dress are still present as is in other paintings. The air of festivity is felt from viewing this.

Another painting in this oeuvre is In the Box, which was made in 1879; this depicts two women in balcony seats in a theater watching the performance unfold before them. The background is handled in a very similar fashion with quick brushstrokes to convey the sense of other figures in the balcony seats across from them. They are using binoculars and are holding fans, one which obscures the woman furthest from the viewer. The Loge from 1882 is showing two women sitting down seeming to wait for a show to start. These paintings connect to Woman with a Pearl Necklace in a Loge because of the subject matter and the continuing themes of Impressionism, femininity, and relevance to the modern woman enjoying a night on the town. "Cassatt found a device for conjoining her fascination with the figure, notably of young women in smart day or evening clothes, with the need to situate them in a social setting-one of the ambiguous spaces of modernity which bourgeois femininity could occupy and contest."

== Reception ==
Cassatt was well praised for her work that was featured in the Avenue de L'Opéra in 1879 during the Fourth Impressionist Exhibition. "Her work stood out in great contrast to the landscapes of Monet, Pissarro, and others, as well as the more precise portraits of Caillebotte and Zandomeneghi." Although mostly positive reviews were given to Cassatt in regards to her work there were still negative reviews as well. This still did not dissuade Cassatt nor her supporters. Cassatt's work was also featured in the Fifth Impressionist Exhibition in 1880, the Sixth Impressionist Exhibition in 1881, and the "Eight and last Impressionist Exhibition in 1886"

Cassatt's paintings can be considered a feminist piece. It shows that "'The ages of woman'": infancy, childhood, youth or coming of age, adulthood and maternity, maturity, and old age" are a prevalent theme in each of her pieces. The dresses she uses to dress her models are "the very emblem of femininity which is the real subject of the painting itself".Whether her paintings were empowering others with femininity, re-conceptualizing it, making the viewer the "passive bearer of the ideas of Femininity" or portraying the close bonds that women had between family and friendships, these paintings had a profound impact on the art world.

== See also ==
- List of works by Mary Cassatt
