= La Loge =

Painting by Pierre-Auguste Renoir

The Theatre Box
- La Loge (French)
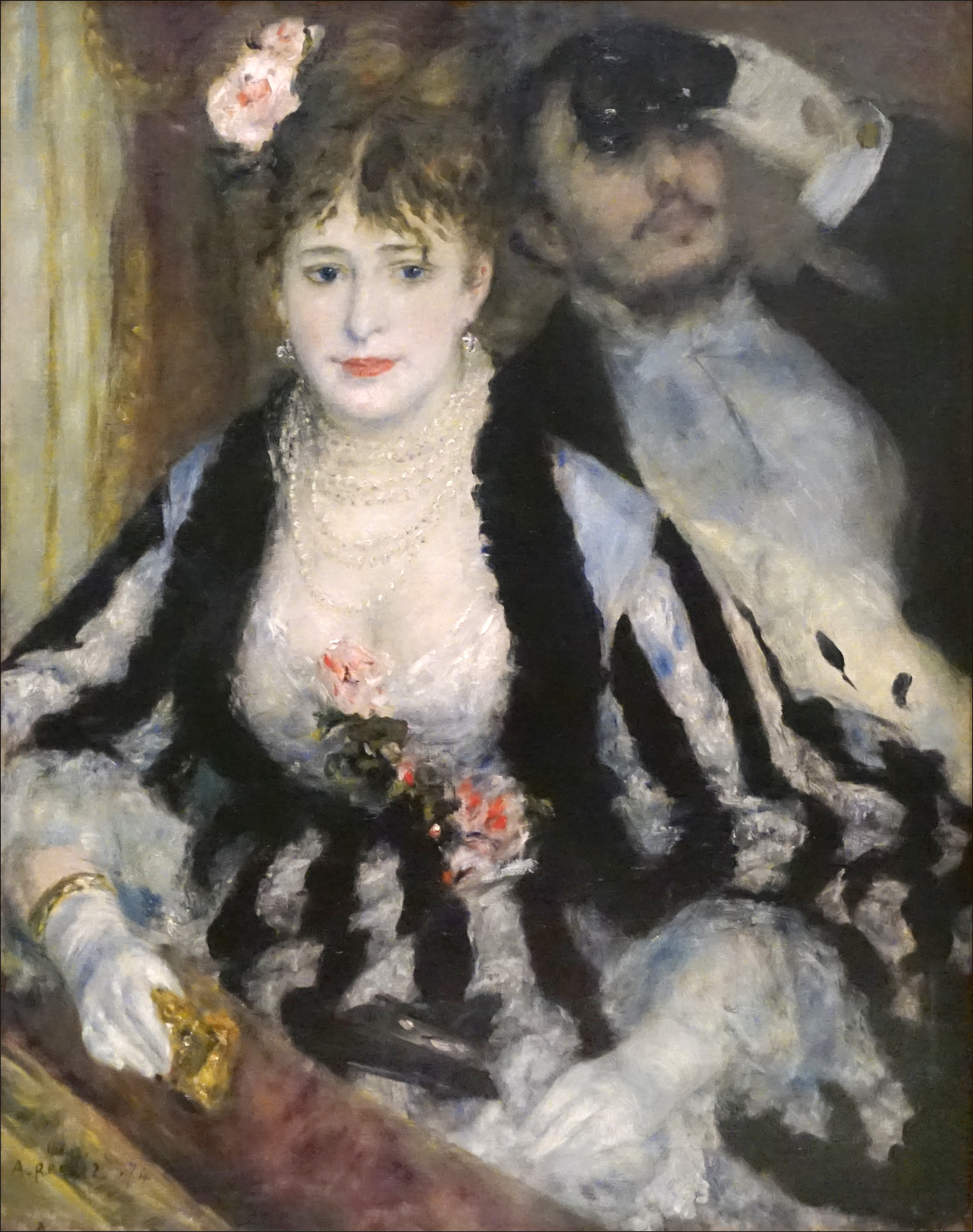
- Artist: Pierre-Auguste Renoir
- Year: 1874
- Medium: oil on canvas
- Dimensions: 80 cm × 63.5 cm (31 in × 25.0 in)
- Location: Courtauld Gallery, London

La Loge ('The Theatre Box') is an 1874 oil painting by Pierre-Auguste Renoir. It is part of the collection at the Courtauld Institute of Art in London.

The painting depicts a young couple in a box at the Paris theatre. The woman was modeled by Nini Lopez, Renoir's new model who would feature in fourteen of his paintings over the next few years. The man in the painting was his brother Edmond, a journalist and art critic. Renoir's La Loge reflects an emerging interest in the "Theatre Box" as a new subject in during this time period. Going to the theatre in nineteenth-century France was as much about being seen as watching the performance. While the woman is making her presence obvious, her companion is scanning the audience through his opera-glasses.

This work encompasses the rising emphasis in fashion in art and its implications on social standing and wealth, while also embodying Renoir's aspirations and longing for the upper class's splendor.

== Composition ==
The painting, La Loge, depicts a young woman, Nini Lopez, sitting a theatre box, while her male companion behind her uses a pair of binoculars to observe something above him.

The young woman is decadently dressed in a striking gown of bold black and white stripes, accessorized with ropes of pearls around her neck, a gold bracelet on her wrist, and an ermine stole gracefully draped across the back of her seat. The bold black and white stripes draw the viewer's gaze to the young woman. The black areas are mixed with blue to create the effect of shadow and light, while the white areas contains tones of blue, green and yellow to create shadows and highlights. In her lap she holds a black fan and a white lace handkerchief. Pink roses adorn her hair as well as the bodice of her gown. The soft hues of the flowers and her skin contrast the strong tones of the black and white gown as well as the darker tones of the background.

The setting of the painting is in a theatre box, where the balcony railing at the bottom corner of the painting suggests that the viewer is sitting in a neighboring theatre box.

An X-ray was taken of the painting and showed that the young woman may have originally had a hat, and there were some small adjustments made to the pose of the arm of the man in the background. Other than these adjustments, Renoir made minimal changes to the overall painting during the painting process.

== Analysis ==
Between the years 1873 and 1880, the theme of the theatre box allowed Renoir to explore the characteristic scenes of modern Paris and study the interplay between the current fashions and the idea of the theatre box as a place to see as well as a place to be seen. These modern-life paintings blurred the lines between portraiture and genre painting, as he would paint portraits of named individuals, while also depicting them in the context of modern images of everyday life. In La Loge, the individuals were the model Nini Lopez and his brother Edmond Renoir attending the theatre, a common activity of the Parisian upper class.

Renoir's depiction of the loge in this painting was still a novel theme in the context of fine art, as the depiction of the theatre box was more common in caricatures and fashion-plate illustrations. In the past, artists such as Honore Daumier and Constantin Guys depicted the loge on a much smaller scale in watercolors or prints.

=== Fashion ===
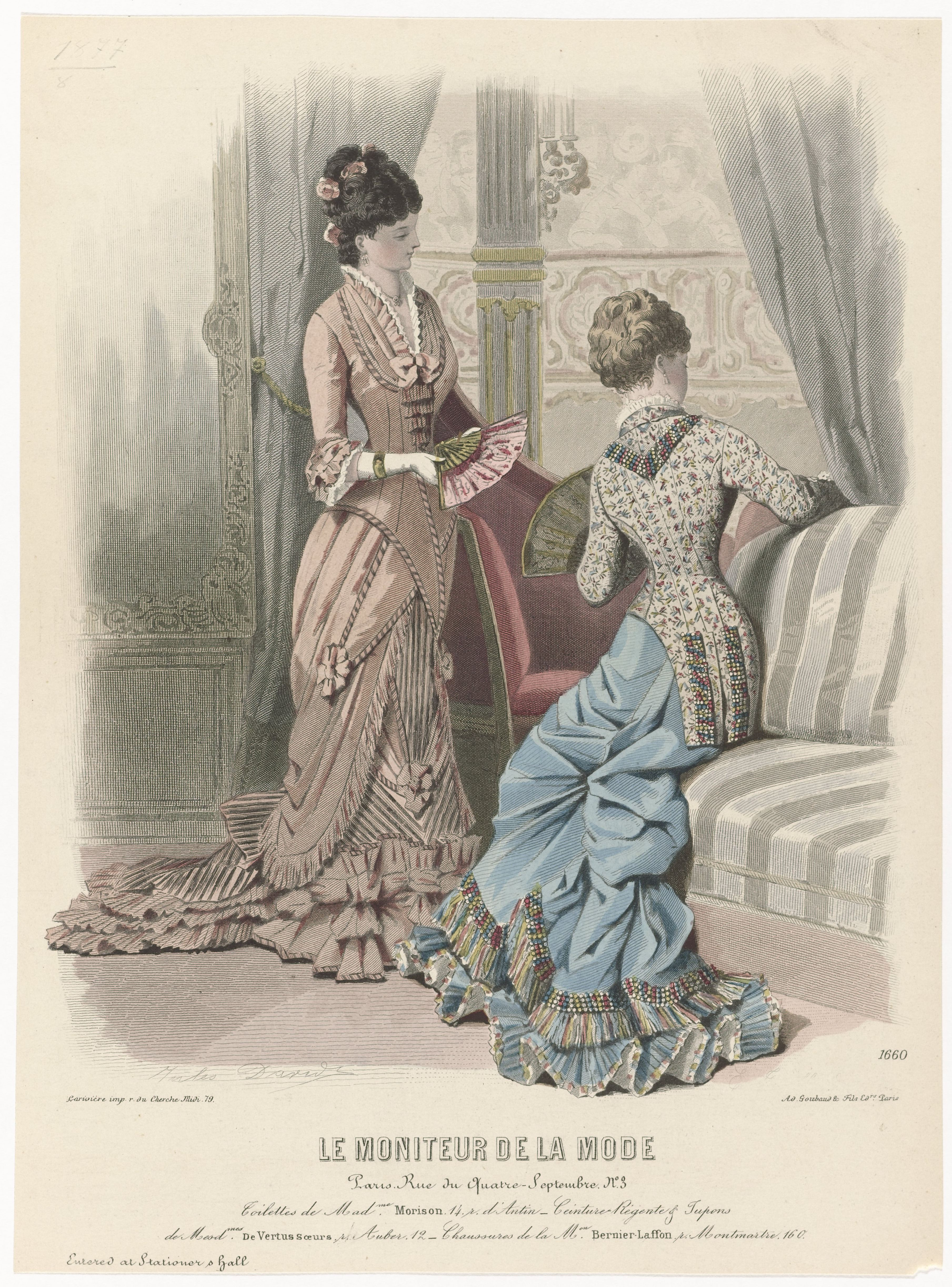
Fashion-plate illustration depicting the loge

Renoir depicts the conventional evening dress worn by a wealthy couple when going out to a theatre. The focus is placed on the young woman, who is positioned in the foreground. The man wears a more understated garment and fades into the background while the woman's bold gown and intricate accessories grab the viewer's attention. During this time period, men's fashion was meant to act as a subdued backdrop to the more colorful and extravagant dress of women.

An analysis by art historian Aileen Ribeiro suggests that the gown is made of white silk gauze and appliquéd black ruched tulle. The dress was in the style known as polonaise, which, along with the striped patterning of the dress, was the current fashion trend of the time. The art critic Charles Blanc remarked how the contrast between the darkness of the black brings out the white in the dress and the young woman's face.

=== Gender and society ===
The theme of the theatre box was also connected to the gender norms of the period. For a woman, the implications of being seen in a theatre box depended on the status of the particular theatre; in some contexts, women risked being seen as members of the demi-monde with questionable moral character. Because Renoir did not make clear the class associations of the theater, his painting invited questions and commentary about its moral message.

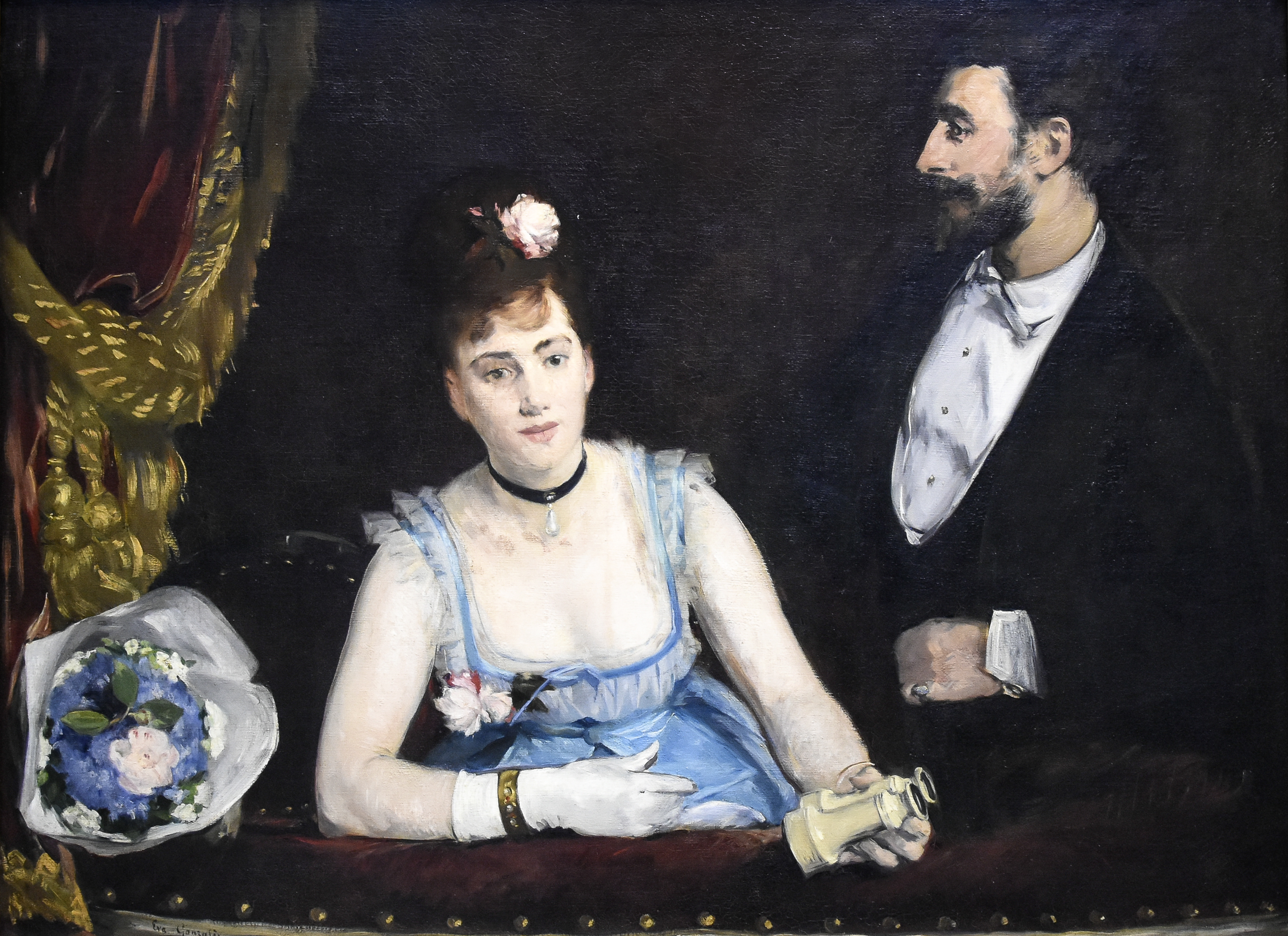
Eva Gonzalès, Une loge aux Italiens, 1874

Art historians have compared Renoir's La Loge to a similar painting by Eva Gonzales, Une loge aux Italiens. While the paintings have compositional similarities, such as the setting in a theatre box and a female figure in the foreground and a male figure in the background, subtle differences between the two paintings suggest different messages about the female figure. Gonzalès's female figure plays a more active role, with a more intent gaze and posture, while Renoir's model Nini appears more passive. Both of the female figures hold binoculars, but the one held by the woman in Gonzalès's painting is much larger and more similar to the binoculars held by the male figure in Renoir's painting.

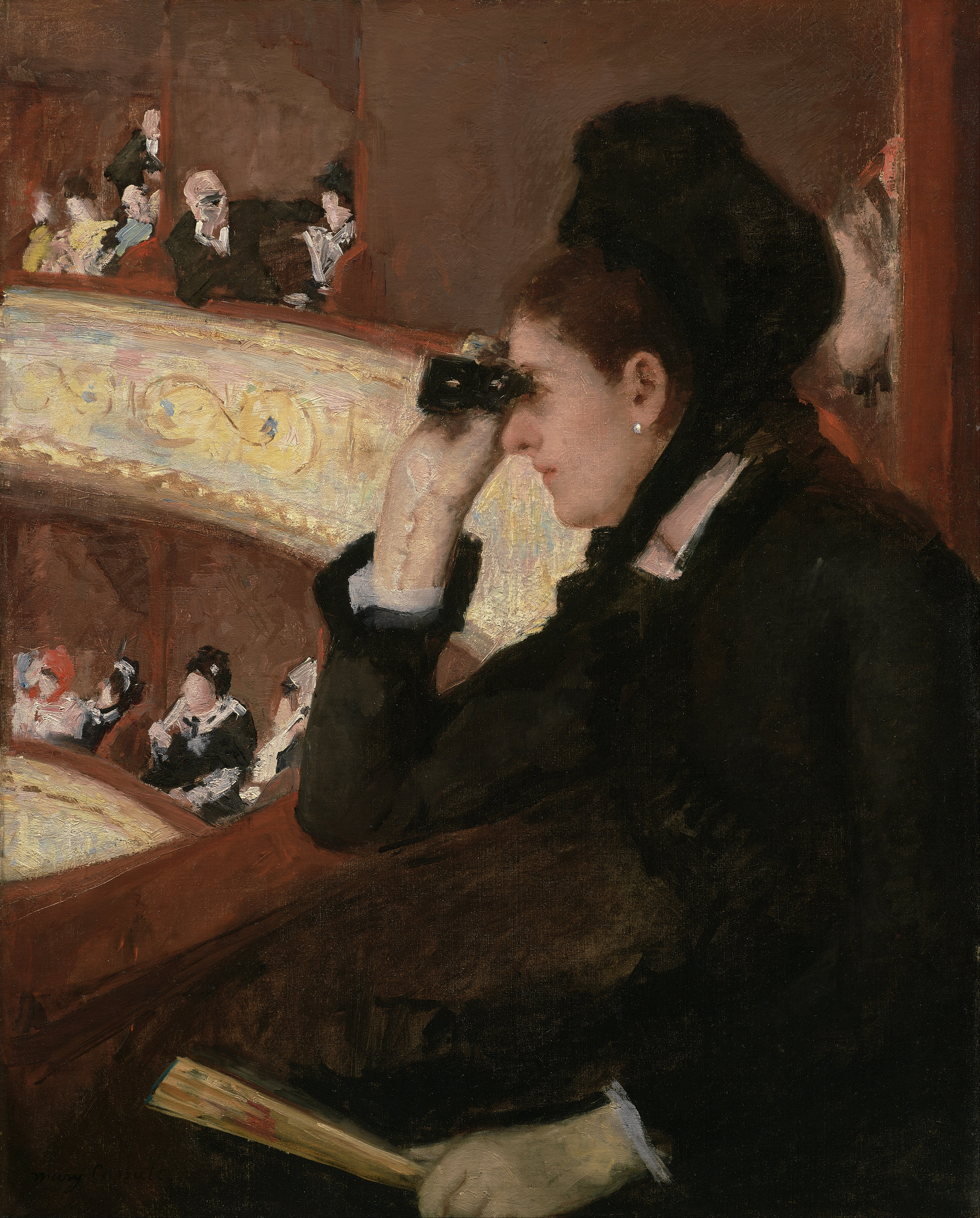
Mary Cassatt, At the Opera, 1878

Another painting that has been compared to Renoir's La Loge is Mary Cassatt's In the Loge. In Cassatt's painting, the woman is dressed in an all black gown and headpiece. She looks out from the theatre box that she is sitting in with a pair of black binoculars. In the background of the painting, a man leans over the balcony with a pair of binoculars, observing the woman in the foreground. Cassatt's painting depicts the female figure in the painting as an active viewer.

== Exhibition and ownership ==
La Loge was included in the Salon in 1874, where reaction was mixed. It was subsequently shown in London in an exhibition organised by his dealer Paul Durand-Ruel, making it one of the earliest Impressionist paintings to be shown in England, but it did not sell at either exhibition. It was bought the following year by the dealer ‘Père’ Martin for 425 francs.

== See also ==
- List of paintings by Pierre-Auguste Renoir
